= Yoon (Korean surname) =

- Hangul: 윤
- Hanja: 尹
- RR: Yun
- MR: Yun

Yoon (Korean: 윤) is a family name in Korea, which means "governor". The name is sometimes also transliterated as Yun, Yune, Yiun, or Youn. According to the 2000 census, 948,600 people had the surname in South Korea. It derives from the Chinese character 尹. In a study by the National Institute of the Korean Language based on 2007 application data for South Korean passports, it was found that 48.9% of people with this surname spelled it in Latin letters as Yoon in their passports, while 40.6% spelled it as Yun and 9.9% spelled it as Youn. Other alternative spellings included Yooun, Yune, Joon and Yeoun.

== Clans and history ==
=== Papyeong clan ===
Family seal of the Papyeong Yoon clan

The Papyeong (파평, 坡平) Yoon clan, which has its seat in Papyeong-myeon, Paju City, is the most well-known Yoon clan. The 2000 South Korean census found 221,433 households claiming membership in the Papyeong clan, with a total population of 713,947.

The clan's founding ancestor is General Yun Sindal, who assisted Wang Kŏn (later King Taejo) in founding the Goryeo Dynasty.

Yun Kwan was a renowned general in the Goryeo Dynasty. He helped form the Pyŏlmuban forces to fight and defeat the Jurchen tribes in 1107.

In 2002, a mummified woman with an unborn fetus was discovered in the tomb of Yun Jeong-jeong, a member of the Papyeong Yun clan. It is believed she was the granddaughter of Yun Wŏnhyŏng, the brother of Queen Munjeong.

Several Papyeong Yun women became queens during the early Joseon Dynasty, they include Queen Jeonghyeon, Queen Jeonghui, Queen Munjeong and Queen Janggyeong.

Papyeong clan has a tradition of shunning the consumption of carps due to its connection with Yun Kwan.

=== Haepyeong clan ===
Last ruling Empress, Empress Sunjeong, was from another Yoon (Yun) clan, Haepyeong Yun. The first Haepyeong Yoon was a person named Yoon GoonJeong (1046~1083) from the Goryeo Danasty. According to the 2000 census, 26,000 people belong to this clan.

Yun Po-sun, the second president of South Korea, is a distant relative of Sunjeong.

== Family feud ==
When the tomb of Yun Kwan was rediscovered in the 18th century, it sparked a 300-year-old family feud between the Yun and Sim Clan. The reason for the feud was because a member of the Sim clan was buried uphill from Yun Kwan's tomb, destroying part of the original tomb in the process. The feud was finally settled in 2008.

== Notable people ==
=== Yoon ===
- Yoon A-jung (born 1981), South Korean actress
- Yoon Bit-garam (born 1990), South Korean professional footballer
- Yoon Bo-hyun (born 1955), South Korean obstetrician and gynecologist
- Yoon Bo-mi (born 1993), South Korean singer and actress, member of girl group Apink
- Bora Yoon (American musician) (born 1980), American composer
- Yoon Bo-ra (born 1989), South Korean singer and actress, former member of girl group Sistar
- Yoon Bo-sang (born 1993), South Korean footballer
- Yoon Bok-hee (born 1946), South Korean singer-songwriter and musical actress
- Yoon Bok-in (born 1969), South Korean actress
- Yoon Byung-ho (stage name Ji Yoon-ho, born 1991), South Korean actor
- Yoon Byung-in (1920–1983), North Korean grandmaster of martial arts
- Yoon Byung-soon (born 1963), South Korean former team handball player, Olympic silver medalist
- Yoon Chae-kyung (born 1996), South Korean singer and actress, former member of girl group April
- Yoon Chae-na (born 2016), South Korean child actress
- Yoon Chae-won (born 2003), South Korean singer, member of girl group CLASS:y
- Yoon Chan (actor, born 1972), South Korean actor
- Yoon Chan (actor, born 1996), South Korean actor
- Yoon Chan-young (born 2001), South Korean actor
- Yoon Chang-jung (born 1956), South Korean journalist and official
- Yoon Cheul (born 1971), South Korean former sailor
- Yoon Da-gyeong (born 1971), South Korean actress
- Yoon Dae-nyeong (born 1962), South Korean writer
- Yoon Deok-ha (born 1954), South Korean sports shooter
- Yoon Deok-yeo (born 1961), South Korean football coach and former player
- Yoon Do-hyun (born 1972), South Korean rock singer-songwriter and actor
- Yoon Do-woon (born 1995), South Korean musician, member of pop rock band Day6
- Yoon Do-young (born 2006), South Korean professional footballer
- Yoon Dong-hun (born 1983), South Korean football manager and former player
- Yoon Dong-min (born 1988), South Korean footballer
- Yoon Dong-sik (born 1972), South Korean mixed martial artist
- Yoon Doo-joon (born 1989), South Korean singer and actor, leader of boy band Highlight
- Yoon Duk-joo (1921–2005), South Korean basketball administrator
- Yoon Eun-hye (born 1984), South Korean singer and actress, member of girl group Baby V.O.X
- Eunice Yoon, American journalist
- Yoon Ga-eun (born 1982), South Korean film director and script writer
- Gene Yoon (born 1945), South Korean businessman and investor
- Yoon Hae-young (born 1972), South Korean actress
- Harry Yoon, American film editor
- Yoon Hee-joon (born 1985), South Korean former speed skater
- Yoon Hee-jun (footballer) (born 1972), South Korean footballer
- Yoon Hee-seok (born 1975), South Korean actor
- Yoon Hi-sang (born 1985), South Korean professional baseball player
- Yoon Hye-ran (born 1969), South Korean community activist
- Yoon Hye-suk (born 1983), South Korean retired volleyball player
- Yoon Hye-young (born 1977), South Korean archer, Olympic gold medalist
- Yoon Hyun (born 1966), South Korean judoka, Olympic silver medalist
- Yoon Hyun-ji (born 1994), South Korean judoka, Olympic bronze medalist
- Yoon Hyun-kyung (born 1986), South Korean team handball player
- Yoon Hyun-min (born 1985), South Korean actor and former baseball player
- Yoon Hyun-sang (born 1994), South Korean singer-songwriter
- Yoon Il-sang (born 1974), South Korean composer, producer, songwriter
- Yoon In-sun (born 1958), South Korean footballer
- Yoon Jae-hyuk (born 2001), South Korean singer, member of boy band Treasure
- Yoon Jae-young (born 1983), South Korean table tennis player, Olympic bronze medalist
- Jean Yoon (born 1962), Canadian actress and writer
- Yoon Je-kyoon (born 1969), South Korean film director, screenwriter, producer
- Yoon Je-moon (born 1970), South Korean actor
- Yoon Jeonghan (born 1995), South Korean singer, member of boy band Seventeen
- Yoon Jeong-yeon (born 1992), South Korean taekwondo practitioner
- Yoon Jeung-hyun (born 1946), South Korean civil servant and politician
- Yoon Ji-hye (born 1979), South Korean actress
- Yoon Ji-min (born 1977), South Korean actress and model
- Yoon Ji-on (born 1990), South Korean actor
- Yoon Ji-su (born 1993), South Korean fencer, Olympic silver medalist
- Yoon Ji-sung (born 1991), South Korean singer and actor, former leader of boy band Wanna One
- Yoon Ji-yu (born 2000), South Korean para table tennis player, Paralympic silver medalist
- Yoon Ji-yoon (born 2005), South Korean singer, former member of girl group Izna
- Yoon Jin-hee (born 1986), South Korean weightlifter, Olympic silver medalist
- Yoon Jin-seo (born 1983), South Korean actress
- Yoon Jin-young (stage name Ash Island, born 1999), South Korean rapper
- Yoon Jong-bin (born 1979), South Korean film director
- Yoon Jong-chan (born 1963), South Korean film director
- Yoon Jong-gyu (born 1998), South Korean footballer
- Yoon Jong-hoon (born 1984), South Korean actor
- Yoon Jong-hwan (born 1973), South Korean football manager and former player
- Yoon Jong-shin (born 1969), South Korean singer-songwriter and record producer
- Yoon Jong-tae (born 1998), Zainichi Korean footballer
- Yoon Ju-yeong (1928–2025), South Korean politician
- Yoon Jung-hee (born 1980), South Korean actress
- Yoon Kwang-cho (born 1946), South Korean ceramic artist
- Yoon Kwang-ung (born 1942), retired Vice Admiral of the Republic of Korea Navy & former Minister of National Defense
- Yoon Kye-sang (born 1978), South Korean actor and singer, member of boy band g.o.d
- Yoon Kyun-sang (born 1987), South Korean actor
- Yoon Kyung-ho (born 1980), South Korean actor
- Yoon Kyung-min (born 1979), South Korean handball player
- Yoon Kyung-shin (born 1973), South Korean handball manager and former player
- Maria Yoon (born 1971), American performance artist and filmmaker
- Yoon Mee-hyang (born 1964), South Korean human rights activist, politician, author
- Meejin Yoon (born 1972), Korean-American architect and designer
- Yoon Mi-ra (born 1951), South Korean actress
- Yoon Mi-rae (born 1981), American-born South Korean singer and rapper
- Yoon Mi-rim (1933–2020), South Korean voice actress and writer
- Yoon Mi-sook (born 1969), South Korean illustrator
- Yoon Min-soo (born 1980), South Korean singer and television personality
- Yoon Mun-sik (born 1943), South Korean actor
- Yoon Myung-june (born 1989), South Korean former baseball pitcher
- Yoon Nam-ho (born 1969), South Korean rower
- Yoon Park (born 1987), South Korean actor
- Sam Yoon (born 1970), American politician
- Yoon San-ha (born 2000), South Korean singer and actor, member of boy band Astro
- Sang Yoon, Korean-American restaurateur and chef
- Yoon Sang-hyun (born 1973), South Korean actor and singer
- Yoon Sang-jeong (born 1998), South Korean actress
- Yoon Se-ah (born 1978), South Korean actress
- Yoon Seok-ho (born 1957), South Korean television drama director
- Yoon Seung-ah (born 1983), South Korean actress
- Yoon Seung-hyeon (born 1988), South Korean footballer
- Yoon Seung-won (born 1995), South Korean footballer
- Yoon Shi-yoon (born 1986), South Korean actor and television personality
- Yoon Shin-young (born 1987), South Korean former footballer
- Yoon So-hee (born 1993), South Korean actress
- Yoon Son-ha (born 1975), South Korean actress, singer, television personality
- Yoon Soo-il (born 1955), South Korean singer-songwriter
- Yoon Soo-kyung (born 1964), South Korean team handball player, Olympic silver medalist
- Yoon Sook-ja (born 1948), South Korean cooking researcher and professor
- Yoon Soung-min (born 1985), South Korean former footballer
- Yoon Suk-min (infielder) (born 1985), South Korean baseball infielder
- Yoon Suk-min (born 1986), South Korean former professional baseball pitcher
- Yoon Sun-woo (born 1985), South Korean actor
- Yoon Sung-hee (born 1973), South Korean writer
- Yoon Sung-hoon (born 1983), South Korean field hockey player
- Yoon Sung-hyo (born 1962), South Korean football manager and former player
- Yoon Sung-hyun (born 1982), South Korean film director and screenwriter
- Yoon Sung-min (1926–2017), South Korean general
- Yoon Sung-sik (born 1970), South Korean television director and producer
- Yoon Sung-yeul (born 1987), South Korean footballer
- Yoon Suk-yeol (born 1960), 13th President of South Korea
- Yoon Tae-ho (born 1969), South Korean manhwa artist
- Yoon Tae-il (born 1964), South Korean former handball player, Olympic silver medalist
- Yoon Tae-young (born 1974), South Korean actor
- Yoon Won-il (born 1983), South Korean footballer
- Yoon Won-il (born 1986), South Korean footballer
- Yoon Ye-bin (born 1997), South Korean basketball player
- Yoon Ye-jin (stage name Nada, born 1991), South Korean rapper and singer
- Yoon Yeo-san (born 1982), South Korean footballer
- Yoon Yoo-sun (born 1969), South Korean actress
- Yoon Yong-gyu (1913–?), Korean film director
- Yoon Yong-ho (born 1996), South Korean footballer
- Yoon Yong-il (born 1973), South Korean former professional tennis player
- Yoon Young-ah (born 1987), South Korean actress
- Yoon Young-bin (born 1962), South Korean aerospace engineer
- Yoon Young-geul (born 1987), South Korean footballer
- Yoon Young-kwan (born 1951), South Korean academic and politician
- Yoon Young-nae (born 1952), South Korean former volleyball player, Olympic bronze medalist

=== Youn ===
- Youn Chul-ho (born 1955), South Korean Presbyterian theologian
- Youn In-wan (born 1976), South Korean manhwa writer
- Victorinus Youn Kong-hi (born 1924), South Korean Roman Catholic archbishop
- Youn Kwan-suk (born 1960), South Korean activist, labourer, politician
- Monica Youn (born 1971), American poet and lawyer
- Samuel Youn (born 1971), South Korean opera singer
- Youn Sung-ho (born 1976), South Korean comedian and DJ
- Youn Sung-woo (born 1989), South Korean footballer
- Youn Yuh-jung (born 1947), South Korean actress

=== Yun ===
- Yun Ah-sun (born 2007), South Korean figure skater
- Yun Bong-gil (1908–1932), South Korean independence activist
- Yun Byeong-hui (born 1976), South Korean retired rhythmic gymnast
- Yun Byung-se (born 1953), South Korean politician
- Yun Chae-ok (born 1963), South Korean scientist and professor
- Yun Chae-rin (born 1990), South Korean freestyle skier
- Yun Chang-ho (born 1951), North Korean sports shooter
- Channy Yun (born 1973), South Korean technologist
- Yun Chi-ho (1865–1945), Korean politician
- Yun Daek (born 1940), South Korean wrestler
- Yun Dong-ju (1917–1945), Korean poet active during the period of Japanese rule
- Yun Gi-hae (born 1991), South Korean footballer
- Yun Gi-jong (1928–2010), North Korean politician
- Yun Gi-su (born 1967), South Korean canoeist
- Yun Gyeong-jae (born 1962), South Korean wrestler
- Yun Kŭnsu (1537–1619), Joseon scholar-official
- Yun Hee-suk (born 1970), South Korean economist and politician
- Yun Heung-gil (born 1942), South Korean novelist
- Yun Ho-jung (born 1963), South Korean politician and former activist
- Yun Hu-myong (1946–2025), South Korean writer, poet and essayist
- Yun Hui-sun (1860–1935), Korean militia leader and independence activist
- Yun Hyon-hi (born 1992), North Korean footballer
- Yun Hyon-seok (1984–2003), South Korean LGBT poet, writer, activist
- Yun Hyong-keun (1928–2007), South Korean artist
- Yun Hyu (1617–1680), Joseon scholar-official
- Yun Il-lok (born 1992), South Korean professional footballer
- Yun Il-seon (1896–1987), South Korean politician, pathologist, anatomist
- Yun Im (1487–1545), Joseon general and politician
- Yun In-sil (born 1976), North Korean footballer
- Isang Yun (1917–1995), Korean-born composer
- James Yun (born 1981), American professional wrestler and actor
- Yun Jeong-hye (born 1966), South Korean volleyball player
- Yun Jeong-mo (born 1946), South Korean writer
- Yun Jeung (1629–1714), Joseon Confucian scholar
- Jihyun Yun, American author and poet
- Yun Jiwan (1635–1718), Joseon scholar-official
- Joon Yun (born 1967), American physician, hedge-fund manager, investor
- Yun Ju-tae (born 1990), South Korean professional footballer
- Yun Jun-sang (born 1987), South Korean professional Go player
- Yun Ki-hyeon (born 1942), South Korean former Go player
- Yun Ko-eun (born 1980), South Korean writer
- Yun Kwae-byung (1922–2000), South Korean martial artist
- Yun Kwan (1040–1111), Goryeo general
- Yun Kwan (judge) (1935–2022), South Korean lawyer and judge
- Yun Mi-gyeong (born 1968), South Korean sprinter
- Yun Mi-jin (born 1983), South Korean archer, Olympic gold medalist
- Yun Mi-kyung (born 1980), South Korean manhwa artist
- Yun Mun-song, North Korean former international table tennis player
- Yun Myung-chan (1949–2017), North Korean football manager and former player
- Yun Nam-han (born 1968), South Korean sprinter
- Yun Nam-jin (born 1962), South Korean fencer
- Yun Ok-hee (born 1985), South Korean archer, Olympic gold medalist
- Yun Posun (1897–1990), 2nd President of South Korea
- Yun Sang-ho (born 1992), South Korean footballer
- Yun Sang-sik (born 1968), South Korean judoka
- Yun Seok-cheol (born 1985), South Korean jazz pianist
- Yun Seok-hee (born 1993), South Korean footballer
- Yun Seok-yang (born 1966), South Korean whistleblower
- Yun Seung-hyun (born 1994), South Korean high jumper
- Yun Sim-deok (1897–1926), Korean singer
- Yun Sŏndo (1587–1671), Korean philosopher, poet, politician
- Yun So-ha (born 1961), South Korean politician
- Yun Sook-woon (born 1934), South Korean weightlifter
- Yun Suknam (born 1939), South Korean artist
- Yun Suk-young (born 1990), South Korean footballer
- Yun Sun-ji (1591–1666), Joseon scholar-official
- Yun Sung-bin (born 1994), South Korean skeleton racer
- Yun Sung-hwan (born 1981), South Korean baseball player
- Yun T'aegyŏng (1876–1935), Joseon and Korean Empire official
- Yun Tusŏ (1668–1715), Korean painter and scholar
- Yun Ung-nyeol (1840–1911), Joseon and Korean Empire general and politician
- Yun Wŏnhyŏng (1509–1565), Joseon scholar-official
- Yun Won-chol (born 1989), North Korean wrestler
- Yun Woon-chul (born 1979), South Korean former footballer
- Yun Yeong-dae (born 1967), South Korean sprint canoeist
- Yun Yeong-ryeol (1854–1939), Joseon politician and soldier
- Yun Yong-chol (born 1968), North Korean boxer
- Yun Yong-ho (born 1965), South Korean rower
- Yun Yong-hui (born 1977), North Korean footballer
- Yun Young-su (born 1952), South Korean writer
- Yun Young-sook (born 1971), South Korean archer, Olympic gold medalist
- Yun Young-sun (born 1988), South Korean former footballer

=== Yune ===
- Johnny Yune (1936–2020), Korean-American actor, singer, comedian
- Karl Yune (born 1975), American actor
- Rick Yune (born 1971), American actor, screenwriter, producer, martial artist, model
- Tommy Yune (born 1955), Korean-American comic artist

== Fictional characters ==
- Yoon Bum, from the 2016−2019 comics series Killing Stalking
- Yoon Se-ri, from the 2019-2020 television series Crash Landing on You
- Yoon Sang-hwa, from 2016 Train to Busan
- Yoon Hae-kang, from 2021 Racket Boys
- Yoon Ji-woo, from 2021 My Name
- Yoon Gwi-nam, from 2022 series All Of Us Are Dead
- Yoon He-ra, from 2024 Hierarchy
- Yoon Seo-ha, from 2024 The Bequeathed

== See also ==
- List of Korean family names
- Korean name
- Korean culture
- Korea
