= Princess Boryeong =

Princess of Goryeo (1066–1113)

Princess of Goryeo
- Predecessor: Princess Jeokgyeong
- Monarch: Wang Hwi, King Munjong
- Born: 1066; Goryeo
- Died: 1113 (aged 47); Goryeo
- Burial: Olleung tomb
- Spouse: Wang Yeong (m. 1079–1112); first cousin
- Issue: Wang Jeong; Wang Ji
Posthumous name
- Gyeongsun (경순, 慶順; "Virtue and Obedience")
- House: House of Wang (by birth and marriage)
- Father: Munjong of Goryeo
- Mother: Queen Inye of the Incheon Yi clan

Korean name
- Hangul: 보령궁주
- Hanja: 保寧宮主
- RR: Boryeong gungju
- MR: Poryŏng kungju

Posthumous name
- Hangul: 경순
- Hanja: 慶順
- RR: Gyeongsun
- MR: Kyŏngsun

Princess Boryeong (1066–1113) was a Goryeo Royal Princess as the younger daughter of King Munjong and Queen Inye who survived infancy along with her elder sister, Princess Jeokgyeong. She was also the youngest living sister to Sunjong, Seonjong, and Sukjong.

She was one of Yi Ja-yeon (이자연)'s maternal granddaughters thus making her the grandniece of Queen Wonseong and Queen Wonpyeong, who were also the older and younger sisters of her paternal grandmother. Her father's 3rd and 4th wife were initially her maternal aunts. The princess later married her first cousin (her uncle's son), Wang Yeong (왕영) who became the Duke Nakrang upon their marriage. Together, they had 2 sons: Wang Jeong (왕정; 王禎) who would marry King Sukjong's 2nd daughter, Princess Heungsu, and Wang Ji (왕지; 王禔) who held an official position during King Yejong's reign.

Princess Boryeong later died a year after her husband in 1113 (8th year reign of her nephew, King Yejong) and was buried in Onreung tomb (온릉; 溫陵), and also received Gyeongsun (경순; 慶順) as her posthumous name.

== Family ==
- Father - Wang Hui, Munjong of Goryeo (문종 고려; 29 October 1019 – 2 September 1083)
- Mother - Queen Inye of the Incheon Yi clan (인예왕후 이씨; 1026 – 5 October 1092)
- Siblings
  - Older brother - Wang Hun, Sunjong of Goryeo (순종 고려; 28 December 1047 – 5 December 1083)
  - Older brother - Wang Woon, Seonjong of Goryeo (선종 고려; 9 October 1049 – 17 June 1094)
  - Older brother - Wang Eung, Sukjong of Goryeo (숙종 고려; 2 September 1054 – 10 November 1105)
  - Older brother - Wang Hu or Uicheon (의천; 30 October 1055 – 28 October 1101)
  - Older brother - Wang Su, Duke Sangan (상안공 왕수; 1057–1095)
  - Older brother - Wang Taeng (도생승통 왕탱; 1059–1112)
  - Older brother - Wang Bi, Marquis Geumgwan (금관후 왕비; 1061–1092)
  - Older brother - Wang Eum, Marquis Byeonhan (변한후 왕음; 1063–1086)
  - Older sister - Princess Jeokgyeong (적경궁주; 1064 – ?)
  - Older brother - Wang Chim, Marquis Nakrang (낙랑후 왕침; 1065–1083)
  - Younger brother - Wang Gyeong (총혜수좌 왕경; 1067 – ?)
- Husband - Wang Yeong, Duke Nakrang (낙랑공 왕영; 1042–1112)
  - Father-in-law - Wang Gi, King Jeonggan (정간왕; 1021–1069)
  - Unnamed mother-in-law (1020 – ?)
- Issue
  - Son - Wang Jeong, Count Seunghwa (승화백 왕정; 1088–1130)
    - Daughter-in-law - Princess Heungsu of the Kaeseong Wang clan (흥수공주 왕씨; 1088–1123)
      - Grandson - Wang Gi, Count Hannam (한남백 왕기; 漢南伯 王杞; 1105 – ?)
      - Grandson - Wang Jae (왕재; 王梓; 1110–1164)
  - Son - Wang Ji (왕지; 王禔; 1088 – ?)
    - Unnamed daughter-in-law (1085 – ?)
