= Princess Bongnyeong (Sukjong) =

Princess of Goryeo (1096–1133)

Princess of Goryeo
- Coronation: 1114
- Predecessor: Princess Ansu
- Monarch: Wang Ong, King Sukjong
- Born: 1096; Goryeo
- Died: 30 June 1133 (age 37/8); Goryeo
- Burial: July 1133
- Spouse: Wang Yeon; half first cousin
Posthumous name
- Jeonggan (정간, 貞簡; "Chaste and Brief")
- House: House of Wang (by birth and marriage)
- Father: Sukjong of Goryeo
- Mother: Queen Myeongui of the Jeongju Yu clan
- Religion: Buddhism

Princess Bongnyeong (Korean: 복녕궁주; Hanja: 福寧宮主; 1096 – 30 June 1133) was a Goryeo princess as the youngest daughter of King Sukjong and Queen Myeongui, also their most favourite and beloved daughter.

She later married her half uncle's son–Wang Yeon the Count Jingang (진강백 왕연). She was said to have a gentle, filial, and diligent personality. Even after getting married, she still achieved solemn virtues, making her loving by both of her parents. Her wealth was the highest among the other royal family members and she was said to be a devout buddhism and revered Dharma by being very hard and passionate in built and decorated the pagodas (탑) and tombs (묘). However, she later died on 30 June 1133 (11th years reign of her nephew) without any issue and her funeral was held at the northwestern foot of Gyeongsan (경산; 京山) a month later.

== Legacy ==
Princess Bongnyeong's epitaph was written by Gim Jeong (김정; 金精) under her brother, the king's order and there, she was called as Royal Woman (왕희; 王姬), Virtuous Woman of the Imperial Clan (종실현녀; 宗室賢女), also Daughter of the Son of Heaven (천자지녀; 天子之女).

According to her epitaph, there was a phrase said:

"The Daughter of the Son of Heaven, like a full moon"
천자(天子)의 따님이여, 보름달 같으셨네

From this, many modern scholars believed that Goryeo declared itself as the Heaven's land since it was the country's heyday and can be seen that the goryeo peoples called their ruler as the "Son of Heaven" (천자; 天子) and regarded it as equivalent to the Chinese emperor. Meanwhile, the words "like a full moon" believed to refer to the Princess's bright appearance that is just like a moon.

Her epitaph was once exhibited in the "Revisiting History Letter, Epitaphs of Goryeo" (다시 보는 역사편지, 고려 묘지명) which held by the National Museum of Korea from July 11, 2006, until August 27, 2006.

== Family ==
- Father - Wang Eung, Sukjong of Goryeo (숙종 고려; 2 September 1054 – 10 November 1105)
- Mother - Queen Myeongui of the Jeongju Yu clan (명의왕후 유씨; ? – 8 August 1112)
- Siblings
  - Older brother - Wang Woo, Yejong of Goryeo (예종 고려; 11 February 1079 – 15 May 1122)
  - Older brother - Wang Pil, Marquis Sangdang (상당후 왕필; ? – 31 October 1099)
  - Older brother - Wang Jing-eom, Wonmyeongguksa (원명국사 징엄; 1090 – 28 May 1141)
  - Older brother - Wang Bo, Duke Daebang (대방공 왕보; ? – 1128)
  - Older brother - Wang Hyo, Duke Daewon (대원공 왕효; 1093 – 6 May 1161)
  - Older brother - Wang Seo, Duke Jean (제안공 왕서; ? – 1131)
  - Older sister - Princess Daeryeong (대령궁주; ? – 1114)
  - Older sister - Princess Heungsu of the Kaeseong Wang clan (흥수공주 왕씨; ? – 1123)
  - Older sister - Princess Ansu (안수궁주)
  - Younger brother - Wang Gyu, Marquis Tongui (통의후 왕교; 1097–1119)
- Husband - Wang Yeon, Count Jingang (진강백 왕연; 晉康伯 王演; ? – 1146) — No issue.
  - Father-in-law - Wang Yu, Duke Jinhan (진한공 왕유; 辰韓公 王愉; ? – 1099)
  - Mother-in-law - name unknown
