= Duke Nakrang =

Goryeo nobleman (1043–1112)

- Born: Wang Yeong; 1043; Goryeo
- Died: 1112 (aged about 70s); Goryeo
- Spouse: Princess Boryeong (before 1112)
- Issue: Wang Jeong; Wang Ji
Regnal name
- Count Nakrang (낙랑백; 樂浪伯; given during King Munjong's reign); Marquess Nakrang (낙랑후; 樂浪侯; given after King Heonjong's ascension); Duke Nakrang (낙랑공; 樂浪公; given during King Sukjong's reign)
Posthumous name
- Gyeongan (경안; 敬安; "Respectful and Calm")
- House: House of Wang
- Father: Wang Gi, Duke Pyeongyang

Korean name
- Hangul: 왕영
- Hanja: 王瑛
- RR: Wang Yeong
- MR: Wang Yŏng

Royal title
- Hangul: 낙랑백, 낙랑후, 낙랑공
- Hanja: 樂浪伯, 樂浪侯, 樂浪公
- RR: Nangnangbaek, Nangnanghu, Nangnanggong
- MR: Nangnangbaek, Nangnanghu, Nangnanggong

Posthumous name
- Hangul: 경안
- Hanja: 敬安
- RR: Gyeongan
- MR: Kyŏngan

Duke Nakrang (Korean: 낙랑공; Hanja: 樂浪公; 1043–1112), personal name Wang Yeong (왕영; 王瑛) was a Goryeo Royal family member as the youngest grandson of King Hyeonjong from his 4th son, Wang Gi. Through his wife, he became a nephew and son-in-law to King Munjong at the same time, which he honoured as a "Count" before became "Duke". He was also one of Queen Jeongui's brother.

In 1069, his father, Wang Gi died and posthumously honoured as King Jeonggan (정간왕; 靖簡王) by Munjong own. Before his death in 1061, "Gyowi" (교위; 校尉), "Geosin" (거신; 巨身) and others prepared a conspiracy case of an attempt to abolished Munjong and established Gi as the new king. Then, it was discovered in 1072 and as a result, all of the late Duke Pyeongyang's honorable titles and status while alive were stripped, and Wang Jin (Yeong's elder brother) got exiled to the Haenam. However, since Wang Yeong was too young at this time, so he didn't get punished.

He later married his first cousin (his uncle's daughter), Princess Boryeong and became Count Nakrang (낙랑백; 樂浪伯) along with appointed as a Susado (수사도; 守司徒). After King Heonjong's ascension, Yeong became Gaebuuidongsamsa (개부의동삼사; 開府儀同三司) and Marquess Nakrang (낙랑후; 樂浪侯). Then, during King Sukjong's reign, Yeong became Suchunggongsin (수충공신; 輸忠功臣) and Duke Nakrang (낙랑공; 樂浪公). As a Sutaewi (수태위; 守太尉), he then was given 2,000 Sik-eup (식읍 2,000호; 食邑二千戶) and 300 Siksilbong (식실봉 300호; 食實封三百戶).

Wang Yeong died in 1112 at the age of 70s and name Gyeongan (경안; 敬安) was given as his posthumous name, while his wife died a year later. Together, they had 2 sons, the elder was Wang Jeong (왕정; 王禎) who would marry King Sukjong's second daughter and the younger was Wang Ji (왕지; 王禔) who would held some official positions during King Yejong's reign.
