= Queen Munjeong (Goryeo) =

Goryeo consort (fl. 12th century)

Queen Munjeong 문정왕후

Dowager consort of Goryeo (as "Noble Consort")
- Tenure: 1122–1138
- Coronation: 1122
- Monarch: King Injong (stepson)
- Died: 23 July 1138; Goryeo
- Burial: Seolleung tomb
- Spouse: Yejong of Goryeo (m. 1121; died 1122)
Posthumous name
- Munjeong (문정, 文貞; "Civil and Chaste")
- House: House of Wang (by birth and marriage)
- Father: Wang Yu, Duke Jinhan
- Religion: Buddhism

Queen Munjeong of the Gaeseong Wang clan (Korean: 문정왕후 왕씨; Hanja: 文貞王后 王氏; d. 23 July 1138 (Note: In the Korean calendar (lunisolar), she died on 15th day of the 6th month of 1138)) was a Goryeo royal family member as the granddaughter of King Munjong who became the third wife of her first cousin, King Yejong. The marriage produced no children.

== Biography ==
=== Early life ===
The future Queen Munjeong was born as the daughter of Wang-Yu, Marquess Jinhan (왕유 진한후) and the granddaughter of Munjong of Goryeo and Worthy Consort Ingyeong. King Munjong was also her future husband, King Yejong's grandfather. Yejong's grandmother was Queen Inye who was Consort Ingyeong's sister and was born as the same daughter of Yi Ja-yeon (이자연) from the Incheon Yi clan. So, Yejong initially Wang's half first cousin.

=== Palace life and later life ===
In 1121, King Yejong chose her as one of his consorts and she entered the palace not long after. A year later, he died and she then stayed at Yeongjeong Palace (영정궁). In 1129, she was given the Royal title of Noble Consort (Korean: 귀비; Hanja: 貴妃) under Yejong's son, King Injong's command. She died in 1138 and received her posthumous name. During her mourning, Injong and his officials stopped the inquiry for three days and put on a small suit.
