= Gwangpyeong =

Korean royal family member (1083–1170)

Duke Gwangpyeong
- Born: Wang Won; 1083; Goryeo
- Died: 1170 (aged about 87/8); Goryeo
- Burial: 1171; Western of Baegak mountain foot
- Spouse: Princess Ansu
- Issue: Wang Gyeong
Regnal name
- Count Gwangpyeong (광평백, 廣平伯; given in 1111 by King Sukjong); Marquess Gwangpyeong (광평후, 廣平侯; given during King Injong's reign); Duke Gwangpyeong (광평공, 廣平公; given during King Injong's reign)
- House: House of Wang
- Father: Wang Do, King Yangheon
- Mother: Queen Yangheon of the Incheon Yi clan
- Religion: Buddhism

Korean name
- Hangul: 왕원
- Hanja: 王源
- RR: Wang Won
- MR: Wang Wŏn

Royal title
- Hangul: 광평공
- Hanja: 廣平公
- RR: Gwangpyeonggong
- MR: Kwangp'yŏnggong

Duke Gwangpyeong (Korean: 광평공; Hanja: 廣平公; 1083–1170 (Note: In the Korean calendar (lunisolar), he died on 12th day of the 1st month of 1170.)), personal name Wang Won (왕원; 王源) was a Goryeo royal family member as the grandson of King Munjong. He was also a politician and physician who was firstly honoured as Count Gwangpyeong.

== Biography ==
=== Early life and relative ===
Born as the second son of Wang Do, Duke Joseon (조선공 왕도) who was the eldest son of King Munjong and Consort Ingyeong in 1083, he was named Won (원; 源). His mother was the second daughter of Yi Jeong (이정) from the Incheon Yi clan. He had an older brother and a younger brother who would become the father of Queen Janggyeong, Queen Uijeong, and Queen Seonjeong.

=== Role in the royal court ===
In 1086 (3rd years reign of King Seonjong), Wang Won was appointed as Geomgyosagongjuguk (검교사공주국; 檢校司空柱國) and later became Euncheonggwangnokdaebu (은청광록대부; 銀靑光祿大夫) and Sutaebu (수태부; 守太傅).

During the reign of King Sukjong, Wang Won became Geomgyosaso Susagong (검교사도 수사공; 檢校司徒守司空) and Suchunggongsin Teukjingeomgyotaewi Susado (수충공신 특진검교태위 수사도; 輸忠功臣特進檢校太慰守司徒) in 1103. He also received Sukjong's 3rd daughter, Princess Ansu as his wife, honoured as Count Gwangpyeong (광평백; 廣平伯) and promoted into Gaebuuidongsamsa (개부의동삼사; 開府儀同三司) in 1111 (6th years reign of King Yejong). Together, they had a son who would marry Yejong's 2nd daughter, Princess Heunggyeong.

During the reign of King Injong, Wang Won became Marquess Gwangpyeong (광평후; 廣平侯) and later the Duke Gwangpyeong (광평공; 廣平公) while held the position of Sutaebo (수태보; 守太保).

=== Role in religion and medicine ===
During his lifetime, Wang Won was said to well versed in both of Confucianism and Buddhism, excellent in medicine (의술; 醫術) and used his ability to widely take care and treat peoples. From a middle age, he fascinated with Buddhism and always read the Lotus Sutra (법화경; 法華經), which believed that he kept nearly 10,000 copies in his own mansion.

=== Death, funeral, and legacy ===
In 1170 (24th years reign of King Uijong), Duke Gwangpyeong fell ill and died at the age 88 in the private residence of the Buddha (불령; 佛嶺), which inherited from his mother and then buried at the western of Baegak Mountain foot a year later. There was an "Epitaph of Wang Won" (왕원묘지명; 王源墓誌銘) that written not long after his death.
