= Duke of Joseon =

Prince of Goryeo (fl. 11th century)

Duke Joseon
- Prince of Goryeo

Posthumously King of Goryeo
- Predecessor: King Jeonggan
- Born: Wang Do before 1054; Goryeo
- Died: 1099; Goryeo
- Spouse: Queen Yangheon
- Issue: Wang Ja; Wang Won; Wang On
Regnal name
- Marquess Joseon (조선후, 朝鮮侯; given in 1061/2); Duke Joseon (조선공, 朝鮮公; given in 1077)
Posthumous name
- King Yangheon of Joseon State (조선국 양헌왕, 朝鮮國 禳憲王; based on "Epitaph of Wang Won")
- House: House of Wang
- Father: Munjong of Goryeo
- Mother: Royal Consort Ingyeong of the Incheon Yi clan

Korean name
- Hangul: 왕도
- Hanja: 王燾
- RR: Wang Do
- MR: Wang To

Royal title
- Hangul: 조선후, 조선공
- Hanja: 朝鮮侯, 朝鮮公
- RR: Joseonhu, Joseongong
- MR: Chosŏnhu, Chosŏn'gong

Posthumous name
- Hangul: 양헌
- Hanja: 禳憲
- RR: Yangheon
- MR: Yanghŏn

King Yangheon (Korean: 조선공; Hanja: 朝鮮公; died 1099 (Note: In the Korean calendar (lunisolar), he died on the 21st day of the 1st month of 1099.)), born Wang Do, was a Goryeo royal prince as the first and oldest son of King Munjong and Consort Ingyeong who would become the grandfather of the future Queen Janggyeong, Queen Uijeong, and Queen Seonjeong. He was known as Marquess Joseon and Duke Joseon during his lifetime.

== Biography ==
=== Early life and disputation of birth year ===
Born as the eldest son of Munjong of Goryeo and Princess Suryeong, he was named Do (도; 燾) and have 2 younger brothers: Wang Su and Wang Yu. Although the year when he was born is unknown, but based on "Epitaph of Yi Ja-yeon" (이자연 묘지명; 李子淵 墓誌銘), at the death of Yi in 1061, only three names that recorded as his royal grandsons: the crown prince, Marquess Gukwon, and Wang Do. From this, it was believed that Wang Do was born before Sukjong in 1054 or Uicheon in 1055.

=== Life and marriage ===
Wang Do's years of becoming the Marquess Joseon (조선후; 朝鮮侯) is unclear, but it was recorded in 1061 (based on Goryeosa) or in 1062 (based on Goryeosajeoryo). He was later honoured as Duke Joseon (조선공; 朝鮮公) in 1077 (31st years reign of his father) and appointed as Sutaebo (수태보; 守太保) in 1086. In 1094 (ascension year of King Heonjong), he became Sutaesa (수태사; 守太師) and Susado (수사도; 守司徒) a year later along with received 5000 sik-eup and 500 siksil-bong (식읍오천호식실봉오백호; 食邑五千戶食實封五百戶).

Wang Do was married with the second daughter of one of his maternal uncle, Yi Jeong (이정) and they had three sons together. Their second son would marry Princess Ansu (안수궁주) who was one of King Sukjong's daughter while their third son's children were all marrying King Injong's children (Queen Janggyeong, Marchioness Daeryeong, Queen Uijeong, Queen Seonjeong, Wang Yeong).

In 1099 (4th years reign of King Sukjong), Duke Joseon died and received name Yangheon (양헌; 襄憲) as his posthumous name given by Sukjong own. According to the "Epitaph of Wang Won" (왕원 묘지명; 王源 墓誌銘), the late Duke Joseon was later honoured as King Yangheon of Joseon State (조선국 양헌왕; 朝鮮國 禳憲王) and following this, his wife, Lady Yi was honoured as "Queen Consort Yangheon" (양헌왕비; 禳憲王妃).

== Family ==
- Father: Munjong of Goryeo (고려문종, 29 December 1019 – 2 September 1083)
- Mother: Worthy Consort Ingyeong of the Incheon Yi clan
- Consorts and their Respective issue(s):
1. Queen Yangheon, of the Inju Yi clan (양헌왕비 인주이씨)
  1. Wang Ja (왕자), first son
  2. Wang Won (광평공 왕원, 1083–1170), Duke Gwangpyeong, second son
  3. Wang On (강릉공 왕온, d.1146), Duke Gangreung, third son
