= Duke of Jinhan =

Prince of Goryeo (fl. 11th century)

Duke Jinhan
- Prince of Goryeo
- Born: Wang Yu; Goryeo
- Died: 1099; Goryeo
- Issue: Wang Gi; Wang Yeon; Queen Munjeong
Regnal name
- Marquess Jinhan (진한후; 辰韓侯); Duke Jinhan (진한공; 辰韓公)
Posthumous name
- Hwasin (화신, 和信; "Harmonious and Veritable")
- House: House of Wang
- Father: Munjong of Goryeo
- Mother: Royal Consort Ingyeong of the Incheon Yi clan
- Religion: Buddhism

Korean name
- Hangul: 왕유
- Hanja: 王愉
- RR: Wang Yu
- MR: Wang Yu

Royal title
- Hangul: 진한후, 진한공
- Hanja: 辰韓侯, 辰韓公
- RR: Jinhanhu, Jinhangong
- MR: Chinhanhu, Chinhan'gong

Posthumous name
- Hangul: 화신
- Hanja: 和信
- RR: Hwasin
- MR: Hwasin

Duke Jinhan (Korean: 진한공; Hanja: 辰韓公; died 1099 (Note: In the Korean calendar (lunisolar), he died on 4th day of the 11th month of 1099.)), also known as Marquess Jinhan and born Wang Yu, was a Goryeo royal prince as the third and youngest son of King Munjong and Consort Ingyeong. He later became the father of the future Queen Munjeong.

== Biography ==
=== Early life and relative ===
Born as the youngest son of Munjong of Goryeo and Princess Suryeong, he was named Yu (유; 愉) and had 2 older brothers: Wang Do and Wang Su. Wang Yu was one of Yi Ja-yeon's (이자연) grandsons, and paternal half brother or maternal first cousin to Sunjong, Seonjong, and Sukjong.

=== Life in the royal court ===
In 1086, Wang Yu was appointed as Geomgyotaewi Susagong (검교태위 수사공; 檢校太尉 守司空) along with his other brothers and became Susado (수사도; 守司徒) in 1094 (ascension year of King Heonjong). Wang Yu was also promoted into Sangseoryeong (상서령; 尙書令) a year later alongside given "6,000 Sik-eup" (식읍 6,000호) and "400 Sik-sil" (식실 400호) while honoured as Duke Jinhan (진한공; 辰韓公).

According to the records left, Wang Yu together with others was once involved in an appeal to the king concerning their brother, Duke Buyeo's marriage. The brothers, including Duke Jinhan, Marquess Geumgwan, Marquess Byeonhan and others criticized Buyeo for his incestuous marriage to his half-sister, Princess Jeokgyeong (적경궁주, and begged their elder brother, King Seonjong to annul the marriage, but the king refused to annul the marriage.

=== Death and children ===
In 1099 (4th years reign of King Sukjong), Duke Jinhan died and was given the name Hwasin (화신; 和信) as his posthumous name. His elder son married Princess Daeryeong (대령궁주)–King Sukjong's 1st daughter and became "Count Hoean" (회안백; 淮安伯), while his younger son married Daeryeong's youngest sister, Princess Boknyeong (복녕궁주) and became "Count Jingang" (진강백; 晉康伯) in 1120. Count Hoean later died in 1126 and Count Jingang died in 1146. Meanwhile, their only sister married King Yejong–Daeryeong and Boknyeong's older brother as his 3rd wife and became known as Queen Munjeong (문정왕후; 文貞王后).

== Family ==
- Father: Munjong of Goryeo (고려문종, 29 December 1019 – 2 September 1083)
- Mother: Worthy Consort Ingyeong of the Incheon Yi clan
- Consorts and their Respective issue(s):
1. Unknown Queen
  1. Wang Gi (회안백 왕기, d. 1126), Count Hoean, first son
  2. Wang Yeon (진강백 왕연, d. 1146), Count Jingang, second son
  3. Queen Munjeong of the Gaeseong Wang clan (문정왕후 왕씨, d. 23 July 1138), first daughter
