= Princess Heungsu =

Princess of Goryeo (1088–1123)

Princess of Goryeo
- Coronation: 1102
- Predecessor: Princess Daeryeong
- Successor: Princess Ansu
- Monarch: Wang Ong, King Sukjong
- Born: 1088; Goryeo
- Died: 1123 (aged 35); Goryeo
- Spouse: Wang Jeong; second cousin
- Issue: Wang Gi; Wang Jae
- House: House of Wang (by birth and marriage)
- Father: Sukjong of Goryeo
- Mother: Queen Myeongui of the Jeongju Yu clan

Princess Heungsu (Korean: 흥수궁주; 흥수공주; Hanja: 興壽宮主; 興壽公主; 1088–1123) was a Goryeo Royal Princess as the second daughter of King Sukjong and Queen Myeongui who later married her uncle's son–Wang Jeong the Count Seunghwa (승화백 왕정), and received "2,000 sik-eup" (식읍 2,000호) and "300 sik-sil" (식실 300호).

She firstly received her title and honor as a princess in 1102 (7th years reign of her father) and in 1105 (her eldest brother's ascension), she was given the "Sungdeok Palace" (숭덕궁; 崇德宮) as her own mansion. That same year, Heungsu gave birth to her first son and upon hearing this, her eldest brother sent Gim Go (김고) on board to gave many gifts to her. According to the records that were left and found, she bore Wang Jeong two sons: Wang Gi (왕기) and Wang Jae (왕재). Meanwhile, the princess died in 1123 (ascension year of her nephew) and her husband died seven years after her in 1130.

== Family ==
- Father: Sukjong of Goryeo (고려 숙종; 1054 – ?)
  - Grandfather: Munjong of Goryeo (고려 문종; 1019–1083)
  - Grandmother: Queen Inye of the Incheon Lee clan (인예왕후 이씨; 1026–1092)
- Mother: Queen Mother Myeongui of the Jeongju Yu clan (명의왕태후 유씨; 1058 – ?)
  - Grandfather: Yu Hong (유홍; 柳洪; 1021 – ?)
  - Grandmother: Lady Kim (김씨; 1025 – ?)
- Husband: Wang Jeong, Count Seunghwa (승화백 왕정, 承化伯 王禎; 1088–1130)
  - Father-in-law, formerly uncle: Wang Yeong, Duke Nakrang (낙랑공 왕영; 樂浪公 王瑛; 1042–1112); son of King Jeonggan.
  - Mother-in-law, formerly aunt: Princess Boryeong (보령궁주; 保寧宮主; 1066–1113); daughter of King Munjong and Queen Inye.
- Issue(s):
  - Son: Wang Gi (왕기; 王杞; 1105 – ?); married his mother's niece–Princess Seungdeok (승덕공주) and became known as "Count Hannam".
  - Son: Wang Jae (왕재, 王梓; 1110–1164)
