= Royal Consort Yongjeol Deok-Bi =

Goryeo consort (fl. 11th–12th centuries)

Virtuous Consort Yongjeol 용절덕비
- Died: 1102; Goryeo
- Spouse: Jeongjong of Goryeo (m. 1040; died 1046)
Posthumous name
- Yongjeol (용절; 容節)
- House: Gyeongju Kim clan
- Father: Kim Won-chung
- Religion: Buddhism

Royal Consort Yongjeol of the Gyeongju Kim clan (Korean: 용절덕비 김씨; Hanja: 容節德妃 金氏; lit. 'Virtuous Consort Yongjeol of the Gyeongju Kim clan'; d. 1102) or before called as Princess Yeonheung (Korean: 연흥궁주; Hanja: 延興宮主) was the fourth wife of King Jeongjong of Goryeo.

She was born in Gyeongju as the daughter of Kim Won-chung (김원충), son of Kim In-wi (김인위) and her younger sister became Munjong of Goryeo's 5th wife. In 1040 (6th year reign of Jeongjong of Goryeo), she was chosen to be his 4th wife and got married not long after that. She then given royal title as Princess Yeonheung (연흥궁주; 延興宮主). Meanwhile, she later died in 1102 (7th year reign of Sukjong of Goryeo) and Posthumously honoured as Virtuous Consort (덕비; 德妃) under King Sukjong's command with the name of Yongjeol (용절; 容節).
