= Duke of Buyeo =

Duke Buyeo
- Prince of Goryeo
- Born: Wang Su; Goryeo
- Died: 1112; Hyeonpung-hyeon, Goryeo
- Spouse: Princess Jeokgyeong (m. 1086)
- Issue: Wang Myeon
Regnal name
- Marquess Buyeo (부여후, 扶餘侯; given in 1080 by King Munjong); Duke Buyeo (부여공; 扶餘公)
- House: House of Wang
- Father: Munjong of Goryeo
- Mother: Royal Consort Ingyeong of the Incheon Yi clan

Korean name
- Hangul: 왕수
- Hanja: 王㸂
- RR: Wang Su
- MR: Wang Su

Royal title
- Hangul: 부여후, 부여공
- Hanja: 扶餘侯, 扶餘公
- RR: Buyeohu, Buyeogong
- MR: Puyŏhu, Puyŏgong

Duke Buyeo (Korean: 부여공; Hanja: 扶餘公; died 1112 (Note: In the Korean calendar (lunisolar), he died on 10th day of the 6th month of 1112.)), born Wang Su and also known as Marquess Buyeo, was a Goryeo royal prince as the second son of King Munjong and Consort Ingyeong, full brother of Wang Do and Wang Yu.

== Life and issue ==
In 1080 (34th years reign of his father), Wang Su was honoured as Marquess Buyeo (부여후; 扶餘侯) and given "1000 sik-eup (식읍 1,000호) after became Gaebuuidongsamsa Geomgyosagong Susangseoryeong (개부의동삼사 검교사공 수상서령 상주국; 開府儀同三司 檢校司空 守尙書令 上柱國). Six years later, he married his own half sister or maternal first cousin (his aunt/stepmother's eldest daughter), Princess Jeokgyeong (적경궁주) and have a son named Wang Myeon (왕면; 王沔) together. However, this marriage was very controversial at that time since Buyeo's brothers, include: Duke Jinhan, Marquess Geumgwan, Marquess Byeonhan and others criticized him for having an incestuous marriage, also begged their elder brother, King Seonjong to annul the marriage, but Seonjong didn't want to hear the appeal and rejected it.

Wang Su later appointed as Susado (수사도; 守司徒), received "2000 sik-eup" (식읍 2,000호) and honoured as Duke Buyeo (부여공; 扶餘公). In 1094 (ascension year of King Heonjong), he became Sutaebo (수태보; 守太保), given "3000 sik-eup" (식읍은 3,000호) and "300 sik-sil" (식실 300호) in 1095 (ascension year of King Sukjong).

Wang Su was exiled to Yangmok-gun, Gyeongsan-bu (now Yangmok-myeon, Chilgok County, North Gyeongsang Province) in 1099 (4th years reign of King Sukjong) without detailed case or charges, but it was recorded that the king personally gave books related Confucianism and Buddhism to his brother who was going to the exile place.

In 1112 (7th years reign of King Yejong), Wang Su committed a crime again and moved to Geoje-hyeon while his only son, Wang Myeon exiled to Jillye-hyeon (now Geumsan County, South Chungcheong Province) at the same time. On his way to Geoje-hyeon, Wang Su died at Hyeonpung-hyeon (now Hyeonpung-eup, Dalseong County, Daegu) and Yejong then stopped the inquiry for three days upon hearing about his uncle's death. A year later, Wang Myeon was pardoned and able to return to Gaegyeong, also received back his position as Sagong (사공; 司空).
