= Wang Do =

Wang Do may refer to:

- Duke Joseon (died 1099), Munjong of Goryeo's son
- Chungsuk of Goryeo (1294–1339), Goryeo king
