= President Yun =

President Yun or President Yoon may refer to:

- Yun Po-sun (1897–1990), 2nd president of South Korea
- Yoon Suk Yeol (born 1960), 13th president of South Korea

== See also ==
- Yun (Korean surname)
