= Queen Seonhui =

Queen Seonhui 선희왕후
- Grand Queen Mother Seonhui (선희왕태후; 宣禧王太后)

Crown Princess of Goryeo
- Tenure: ?–before 1083
- Predecessor: Crown Princess Im
- Successor: Crown Princess Wang
- Died: 17 March 1126; Goryeo
- Burial: 1130; Seongneung Tomb, Gaeseong-si
- Spouse: Sunjong of Goryeo (before 1083)
Regnal name
- Princess Yeonbok (연복궁주, 延福宮主; given in c.1126)
Posthumous name
- Queen Gongui Hwasun Seonhui (공의화순선희왕후; 恭懿和順宣禧王后)
- House: Gyeongju Gim (by birth); House of Wang (by marriage)
- Father: Gim Yang-geom
- Religion: Buddhism

Queen Seonhui of the Gyeongju Gim clan (Korean: 선희왕후 김씨; Hanja: 宣禧王后 金氏, d. 17 March 1126 (Note: In the Korean calendar (lunisolar), she died on 22nd day of the 2nd month of 1126.)) was the second wife of King Sunjong of Goryeo and his primary wife when he was still a crown prince.

She entered the palace as the crown princess consort (태자비; 太子妃) to the Sunjong who was then still a crown prince and became his favourite since they were close to each other and had a good relationship. However, for some reason, she was hated badly by her father-in-law and eventually expelled from the palace by the King's order before her husband ascended the throne. Since she lived in "Yeonbok Palace" (연복궁; 延福宮), she was then given a royal title of Princess Yeonbok (연복궁주; 延福宮主) in 1126. On 17 March 1126, she died after about 43 years outlived than her late husband and received her posthumous name, also buried in Seongneung tomb (성릉; 成陵) along with him in 1130 under King Injong's command.

== Posthumous name ==
- In April 1140 (18th year reign of King Injong), name Gong-ui (공의; 恭懿) was added.
- In October 1253 (40th year reign of King Gojong), name Hwa-sun (화순; 和順) was added to her posthumous name too.
