= Princess Ansu =

Princess of Goryeo (fl. 12th century)

Princess of Goryeo
- Coronation: 1105
- Predecessor: Princess Heungsu
- Successor: Princess Boknyeong
- Monarch: Wang Ong, King Sukjong
- Born: before 1105; Goryeo
- Spouse: Wang Won; half first cousin
- Issue: Wang Gyeong
- House: House of Wang (by birth and marriage)
- Father: Sukjong of Goryeo
- Mother: Queen Myeongui of the Jeongju Yu clan

Princess Ansu (Korean: 안수궁주; 안수공주; Hanja: 安壽宮主; 安壽公主), also known as Princess Sunjeong (순정공주; 順貞公主) was a Goryeo Royal Princess as the third daughter of King Sukjong and Queen Myeongui.

== Biography ==
Born prior to 1105, she was the third daughter of King Sukjong and Queen Myeongui. The Princess was also the younger sister of the future King Yejong.

She firstly received her title in 1105 (10th year of reign of her father) and was given the "Ansu Palace" (안수궁; 安壽宮) as her own mansion after her eldest brother's ascension in the same year. She later married her half uncle's son, Wang Won the Duke Gwangpyeong (광평공 왕원), and had a son, Wang Gyeong the Duke Anpyeong (안평공 왕경), who would marry Ansu's niece through her older brother, Princess Heunggyeong (흥경공주).

== Family ==
- Father - Wang Eung, Sukjong of Goryeo (숙종 고려; 2 September 1054 – 10 November 1105)
- Mother - Queen Myeongui of the Jeongju Yu clan (명의왕후 유씨; ? – 8 August 1112)
- Siblings
  - Older sister - Princess Daeryeong (대령궁주; ? – 1114)
  - Older brother - Wang Woo, Yejong of Goryeo (예종 고려; 11 February 1079 – 15 May 1122)
  - Older brother - Wang Pil, Marquis Sangdang (상당후 왕필; ? – 31 October 1099)
  - Older sister - Princess Heungsu of the Kaeseong Wang clan (흥수공주 왕씨; ? – 1123)
  - Older brother - Wang Jing-eom, Wonmyeongguksa (원명국사 징엄; 1090 – 28 May 1141)
  - Older brother - Wang Bo, Duke Daebang (대방공 왕보; ? – 1128)
  - Older brother - Wang Hyo, Duke Daewon (대원공 왕효; 1093 – 6 May 1161)
  - Older brother - Wang Seo, Duke Jean (제안공 왕서; ? – 1131)
  - Younger sister - Princess Boknyeong (복녕궁주; 1096 – 30 June 1133)
- Husband - Wang Won, Duke Gwangpyeong (광평공 왕원; 1083 – 12 January 1170)
  - Father-in-law - Wang Do, Duke Joseon (조선공 왕도; ? – 1099)
  - Mother-in-law - Royal Consort Yangheon of the Incheon Yi clan (양헌왕비 인주 이씨)
- Issue
  - Son - Wang Gyeong, Duke Anpyeong (안평공 왕경; 1117–1177)
    - Daughter-in-law - Princess Heunggyeong (흥경공주; ? – 1176)
      - Granddaughter - Lady Wang of the Kaeseong Wang clan (개성 왕씨; 開城 王氏)
        - Grandson-in-law - Wang Gi, Duke Susa (수사공 왕기)
      - Grandson - Wang Seong, Marquis Sian (시안후 왕성; ? – 1178)
        - Granddaughter-in-law - Princess Changrak (창락궁주; 1141? – 1216)
          - Great-Granddaughter - Queen Wondeok of the Yu clan (원덕왕후 유씨; ? – 1239); second wife of King Gangjong
