= King Jeonggan =

King Jeonggan 정간왕 靖簡王

Prince of Goryeo
- Reign: ?–?
- Predecessor: Wang Hwi
- Successor: Wang Chung

Posthumously King of Goryeo
- Predecessor: King Munwon
- Successor: King Yangheon
- Born: Wang Ki; 1021; Yeondeok Palace, Gaegyeong, Goryeo
- Died: 1069 (aged about 48/9); Goryeo
- Issue: Wang Chin; Wang Kŏ; Wang Yŏng; Queen Jeongui
Posthumous name
- Jeonggan (정간, 靖簡; "Tranquil and Brief")
- House: Wang
- Father: Hyeonjong of Goryeo
- Mother: Queen Wonhye of the Ansan Kim clan

Korean name
- Hangul: 왕기
- Hanja: 王基
- RR: Wang Gi
- MR: Wang Ki

Royal title
- Hangul: 평양공, 개성국공
- Hanja: 平壤公, 開城國公
- RR: Pyeongyanggong, Gaeseonggukgong
- MR: P'yŏngyanggong, Kaesŏnggukkong

Posthumous name
- Hangul: 정간
- Hanja: 靖簡
- RR: Jeonggan
- MR: Chŏnggan

King Jeonggan (1021–1069; (Note: In the Korean calendar (lunisolar), he was born on 25th day of the 8th month of 1021 and died on 4th day of the 11st month of 1069.) born Wang Ki) was a Goryeo Royal Prince as the 5th son of King Hyeonjong, from Queen Wonhye. He was a brother to King Munjong and Queen Hyosa, also became both of paternal uncle and father-in-law to King Sunjong. He was known as Duke Pyeongyang and Duke of the Gaeseong State during his lifetime.

The Prince was born in 1021 (12th year reign of his father) at Yeondeok Palace (연덕궁), his mother's official residence with the name of "Wang Ki" (왕기; 王基). Through his parent, he became both of paternal half younger brother and maternal first cousin to Wang Heum and Wang Hyeong. In 1031, Ki was appointed as Honginsunghyogwangdeokgongsin Sutaewi Sangseoryeong (홍인숭효광덕공신 수태위 겸 상서령; 弘仁崇孝光德功臣 守太尉兼尙書令) and honoured as Duke of the Gaeseong State (개성국공; 開城國公) while three years later became a Sutaebo (수태보; 守太保) during the first year reign of King Jeongjong.

At the beginning of King Munjong's year, Ki started fell ill and the king then sent an Eoui (어의) to take care of his younger brother. In 1049, Ki became Sutaesa Naesaryeong (수태사 겸 내사령; 守太師 內史令) and then became Jungseoryeong (중서령; 中書令) in 1061. On his birthday, it was said that he was given a Royal Ceremonial Service (예폐; 禮幣) and honoured as Duke Pyeongyang (평양공; 平壤公). However, he later died in 1069 due to his illness and then honoured as King Jeonggan (정간왕; 靖簡王).

In 1072, "Gyowi" (교위; 校尉), "Geosin" (거신; 巨身) and others who did a conspiracy case of an attempt to abolished Munjong and established Ki as the new king, were discovered and executed, while his eldest son, Wang Chin got exiled to the Haenam. Beside Chin, Duke Pyeongyang also had 2 other sons (Wang Geo and Wang Yeong) and a daughter who would marry King Sunjong.

== Family ==
- Father: Hyeonjong of Goryeo (1 August 992 – 17 June 1031, r. 1009–1031)
- Mother: Queen Wonhye of the Ansan Kim clan (d. 1022)
- Consorts and their Respective issue(s):
1. Unknown Queen
  1. Wang Chin (왕진, d.1072), first son
  2. Wang Kŏ (왕거), second son
  3. Wang Yŏng (1043–1112), Prince Nakrang, third son
  4. Queen Jeongui of the Kaesong Wang clan, first daughter
