= Yun Kwan =

General of Goryeo dynasty

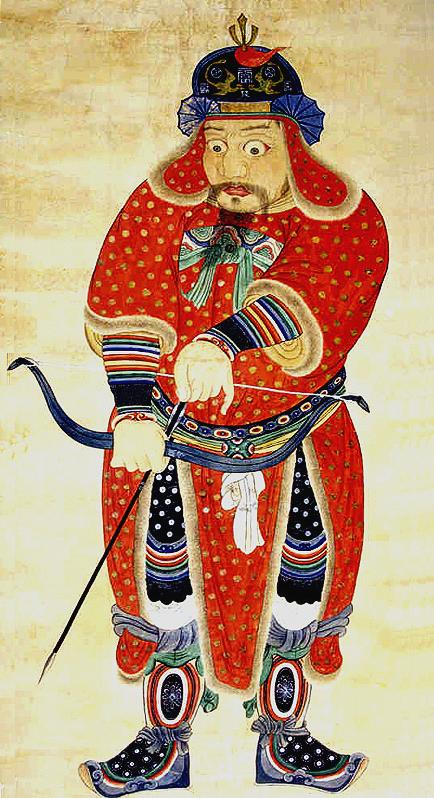

Korean name
- Hangul: 윤관
- Hanja: 尹瓘
- RR: Yun Gwan
- MR: Yun Kwan

Yun Kwan (Korean: 윤관; Hanja: 尹瓘; 12 July 1040 – 15 June 1111 (Note: In Lunar Calendar, Yun was born on 1 June 1040 and died on 8 May 1111)) was a Korean military general of Goryeo who was known for training the Pyŏlmuban and leading it to victory against the aggressive Jurchen tribes.

== Early life ==
Yun was born as a descendant of official Yun Sindal (윤신달; 尹莘達). He passed the Goryeo civil service exam during the reign of Munjong. In 1087, Yun became a Chulchusa, and inspected Gwangju, Cheongju, and Chungju. When Sukjong became the new King, Yun was sent to the Liao dynasty to notify Sukjong's coronation. In 1098, Yun went to an ambassador of Northern Song dynasty, and told the court information about Sukjong's coronation.

== The Jurchen Expedition ==
Jurchen tribes lived to the north of Goryeo. The Jurchens always rendered tribute to the kings of Goryeo, but the Jurchen tribes grew strong and were soon united under Wanyan clan. They began to violate the Goryeo-Jurchen borders, and eventually invaded Goryeo. Goryeo, however, did not have a powerful army at that time, due in part to a century of peaceful existence. With the invasion of the Jurchen, King Sukjong ordered all available soldiers into battle, but this ended in defeat. General Yun Kwan convinced the Jurchen leaders to pull their troops back, and this ended the invasion of the Jurchen.

== Victory over the Jurchen ==
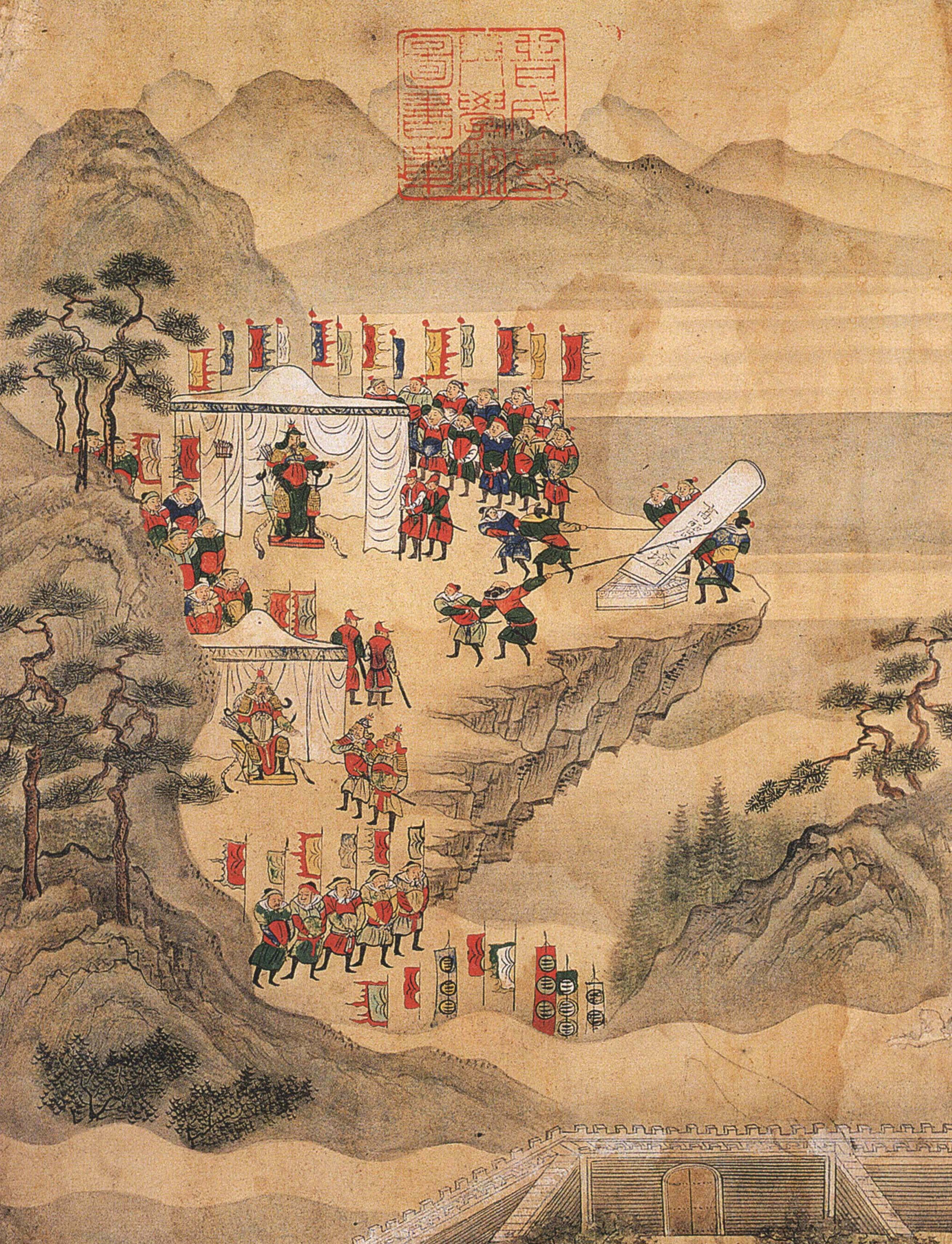
General Yun Kwan and his army.

After experiencing the invasion by the Jurchen, Yun Kwan realized that Goryeo lacked efficient cavalry units, and requested permission from King Sukjong to train and reorganize the current Goryeo military into a professional army that would contain well-trained cavalry units. Finally, in 1107, General Yun led the newly formed Goryeo army, a force of approximately 170 thousand men called Pyŏlmuban, and attacked the Jurchen tribes. Though the war lasted for several years, the Jurchen were ultimately defeated, and surrendered to Yun Kwan. To mark the victory, General Yun built nine fortresses to the northeast of the Goryeo-Jurchen borders (동북 9성; 東北 九城). In 1108, however, General Yun was given orders to withdraw his troops by Goryeo's new ruler, King Yejong. After the war, Yun brought 346 prisoners, 96 horses, and about 300 cows.

Due to manipulation and court intrigue from opposing factions, he was discharged from his post in 1108. Along with this, the opposing factions fought to make sure that the new nine fortresses were returned to the Jurchens. Soon after, Yun Kwan was released from his prison in 1110, and was offered a chance to return to his duties as general, but he refused and returned to his hometown. A year later, in 1111, Yun Kwan died to illness.

== Aftermath ==
After the death of Yun Kwan, the Jurchen destroyed the Liao dynasty, and established the Jin dynasty. With the rise of the Jin, Goryeo was no longer able to trade with the Song dynasty or any of the other neighboring nations, and became isolated, which contributed to the weakening of the kingdom.

== Dispute ==
The extent of Yun Kwan's military campaigns has been in dispute for centuries. While the general and traditional belief is that his nine fortresses were built in present-day Hamheung in North Korea, a number of historical sources seem to indicate that Yun took parts of Manchuria for Goryeo, temporarily claiming the land of Goryeo's ancestors, Goguryeo.

== Family feud ==
Due to wars and invasions, the location of Yun Kwan's tomb was lost until the 18th century. Yun Kwan's tomb was located near another tomb belonging to the Sim clan. Because of this, a family feud erupted between the Yuns and Sims lasting 300 years.

== Family ==
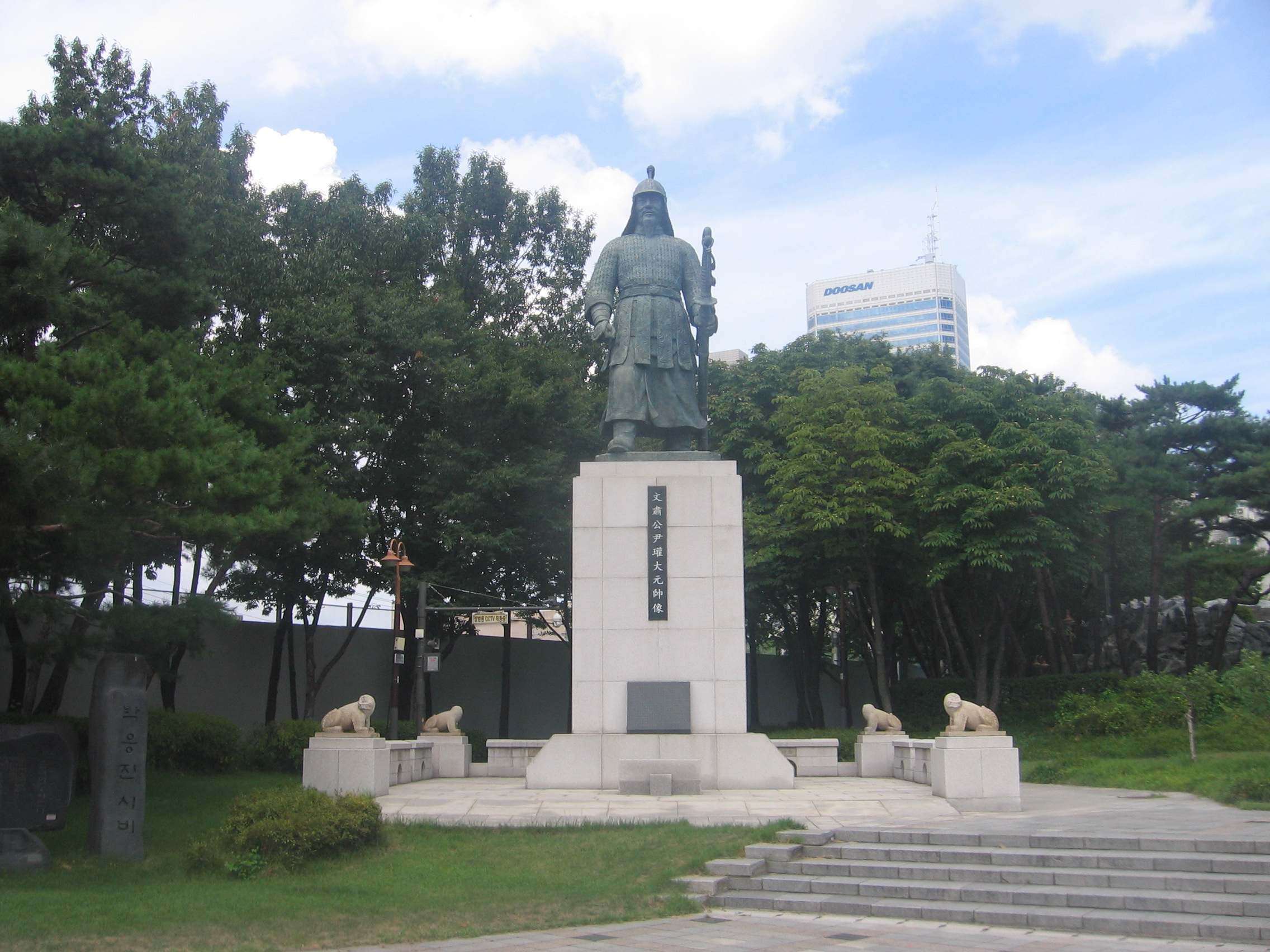
Statue of Yun Kwan at Hullyeonwon Park, Seoul, South Korea.

- Father
  - Yun Chiphyŏng (윤집형; 尹執衡)
- Wife
  - Lady Yi of the Inju Yi clan (인천 이씨; 仁川 李氏)
- Issue
  - Son - Yun Ŏnin (윤언인; 尹彦仁)
  - Son - Yun Ŏnsun (윤언순; 尹彦純)
  - Son - Yun Ŏnam (윤언암)
  - Son - Yun Ŏnsik (윤언식; 尹彦植; ? – 1149)
  - Son - Yun Ŏni (윤언이; 尹彦頤; ? – May 1149)
  - Son - Yun Ŏnmin (윤언민; 尹彦旼; 1095 – 23 April 1154)
  - Daughter - Lady Yun of the Papyeong Yun clan
  - Daughter - Lady Yun of the Papyeong Yun clan

== See also ==
- History of Korea
- Military history of Korea
- Yejong of Goryeo

== Bibliography ==
- Brown, Kerry (2014), Berkshire Dictionary of Chinese Biography, Berkshire Publishing Group LLC
