= Queen Myeongui =

Goryeo queen consort (fl. 12th century)

Queen Myeongui 명의왕후

Queen consort of Goryeo
- Tenure: 1099–1105
- Coronation: 1099
- Predecessor: Queen Sasuk
- Successor: Queen Gyeonghwa

Queen dowager of Goryeo
- Tenure: 1105–1112
- Coronation: 1105
- Predecessor: Queen Dowager Sasuk
- Successor: Queen Dowager Gongye
- Monarch: King Yejong (son)
- Born: c.1054/5 Jeongju-si, Gaeseong-bu, Gaegyeong-si, Goryeo
- Died: 14 July 1112 (aged about late 60s / early 70s); Sinbak Temple, Gaeseong-bu, Gaegyeong-si, Goryeo
- Burial: August 1112; Sungneung tomb
- Spouse: Sukjong of Goryeo (m. 1079)
- Issue: Wang U Princess Daeryeong; Princess Heungsu; Princess Ansu; Wang Pil; Wang Jing-eom; Wang Bo; Wang Hyo; Wang Seo; Princess Boknyeong; Wang Gyo
Regnal name
- Princess Myeongbok (명복궁주; 明福宮主; from before 1079); Princess Yeondeok (연덕궁주; 延德宮主); Queen Mother Myeongui (명의태후; 明懿太后; from 1105); Grand Queen Mother Myeongui (명의왕태후; 明懿王太后; from 1108)
Posthumous name
- Grand Queen Mother Yuga Gwanghye Myeongui 유가광혜명의왕태후 (柔嘉光惠明懿王太后)
- House: Chŏngju Yu clan
- Father: Yu Hong
- Mother: Lady Kim, of the Gyeongju Kim clan

Queen Myeongui of the Chŏngju Yu clan (Korean: 명의왕후 유씨; Hanja: 明懿王后 柳氏; d. 8 August 1112) was a Korean queen consort as the first and primary wife of King Sukjong of Goryeo and the mother of most of his children.

== Biography ==
=== Marriage and palace life ===
She married Sukjong when he was still known as Duke Gyerim (계림공). Before 1079, she was given royal title as Princess Myeongbok (명복궁주; 明福宮主) while living in Myeongbok Palace and later changed into Princess Yeondeok (연덕궁주; 延德宮主) when she moved to Yeondeok Palace. Her mother, Lady Kim was formally called as "Grand Lady of the Nakrang State" (낙랑국대부인; 樂浪國大夫人).

Then, following her husband who ascended the throne as a King, she become a Queen Consort in 1099. But, in the Goryeosa, there was some misunderstanding because her name after becoming a queen consort, her clan name was written as Yi clan (이씨; 李氏) which wasn't her clan.

However, on 10 November 1105, her husband passed away and their oldest son, Wang U ascended the throne as Yejong of Goryeo those making Yu honoured both as Queen Mother (태후; 太后) and Grand Queen Mother (왕태후; 王太后) in 1105. Beside Yejong, she bore Sukjong 6 other sons and 4 daughters. After that, she was given Sungmyeong Mansion (숭명부; 崇明府) in Cheonhwa Hall (천화전; 天和殿) as her residence and affiliated institution. As a queen dowager, her birthday was also specially celebrated.

=== Later life ===
==== Death ====
On 8 August 1112, the queen dowager caught an illness and died suddenly after went to recuperation outside the palace at her old age in Sinbak Temple. On 8th month (Lunar calendar) in the same year, she was buried in Sungneung Tomb (숭릉; 崇陵) and received her posthumous name.

==== Funeral ====
During her funeral, the Liao dynasty sent their envoys to mourn. But, seeing this, the internal court said:

Your Majesty the King, isn't this the first time they've been to the Queen Mother's ancestral rites?, Congratulations on showing such courtesy to the In State!

("임금님, 쟤네들이 태후님 제사 지내러 온 건 이번이 처음 아닌가요? 인국(隣國)이 이런 예우(禮)를 보여준걸 축하드립니다!").

==== Posthumous name ====
- In 1140 (18th year reign of King Injong), name Yu-ga (유가; 柔嘉) was added.
- In October 1253 (40th year reign of King Gojong), name Gwang-hye (광혜; 光惠) was added to her posthumous name too.
