= Hullyeonwon Park =

Park in Seoul, South Korea

- 훈련원공원
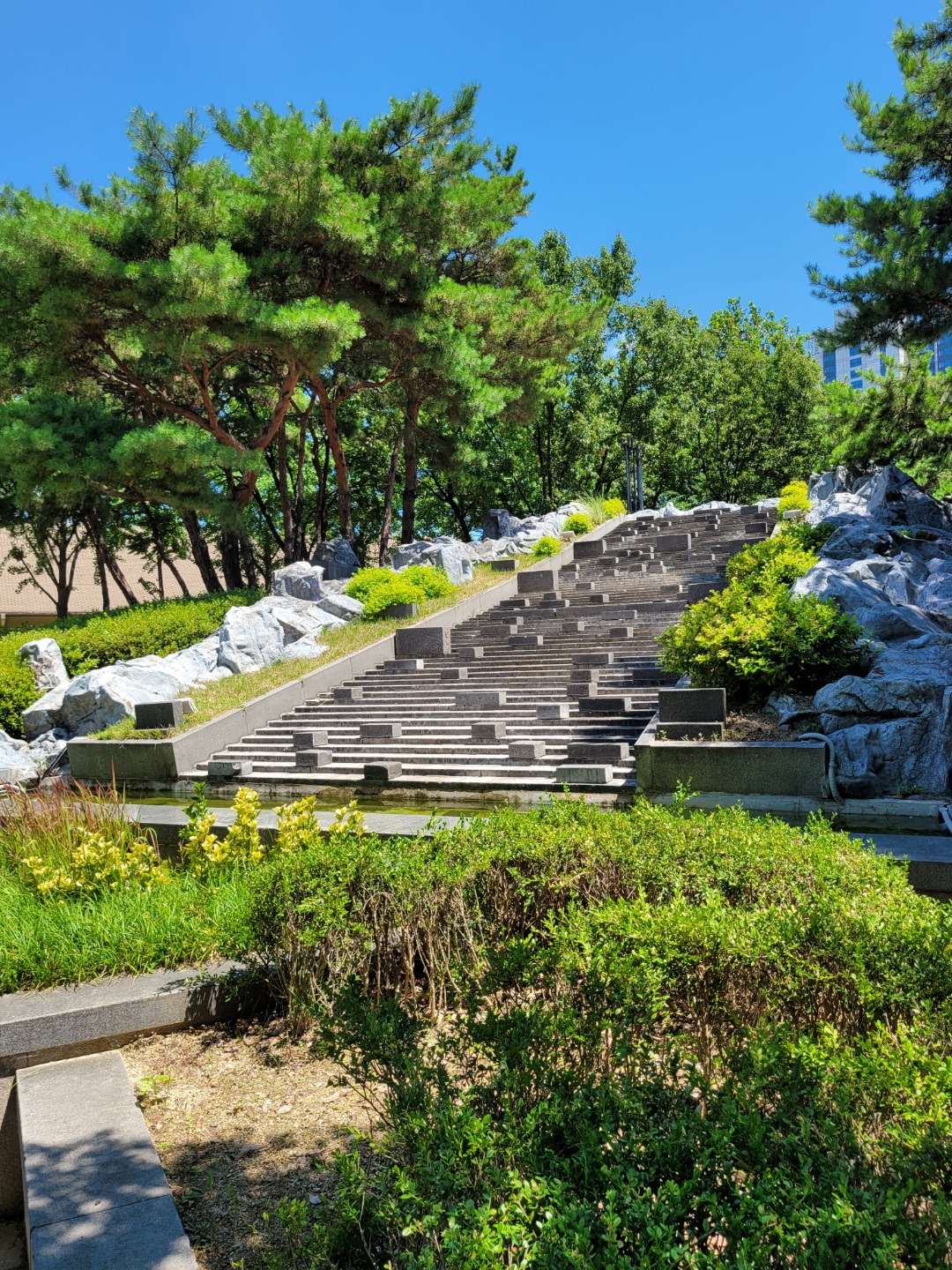
- A staircase in the park (2022)
- Location: Jung District, Seoul, South Korea
- Coordinates: 37.5673°N 127.0038°E
- Area: 1.67346 ha (4.1352 acres)
- Established: June 30, 1997
- Etymology: Hullyeonwon

Hullyeonwon Park (Korean: 훈련원공원; Hanja: 訓鍊院公園) is a public park in Jung District, Seoul, South Korea. It was established on June 30, 1997, and has an area of 1.67346 ha (4.1352 acres).

The park is named for the Hullyeonwon: the Joseon-era government ministry that oversaw military training.

== Description ==
The park has over 22,000 trees of at least 26 species, over 9,000 m^{2} (97,000 sq ft) of lawns, and a fountain. There is a waterfall in the park that is deactivated during the winter. There is a statue of the Goryeo-era general Yun Kwan. It also has an indoor exercise facility that has badminton courts, table tennis tables, and aerobics facilities. It also as well as outdoor exercise equipment.

The park hosts various events. One such event was held in July 2023, and involved water-related activities and inflatable castles for children.

The park is closest to exit 6 of Jongno 5-ga station on Seoul Subway Line 1.

== History ==
The Hullyeonwon was first established as the Hullyeongwan (훈련관) during the Joseon period in 1392. The office was in charge of training soldiers in martial arts and archery. Beginning around the reign of King Taejong (r. 1400–1418), the Hullyeonwon moved their training facilities to the location of the current park.

In 1506, plotters of the Jungjong coup used the space. Famed 16th-century Korean admiral Yi Sun-sin once fell from a horse and injured his left leg while taking an exam at the Hullyeonwon.

It continued to be used until around the end of the 1897–1910 Korean Empire period. Afterwards, the land became used as a parking lot for various entities over time.

In 1926, the area was used as a funeral home for the former Korean emperor Sunjong. On June 10, the first day of his public funeral, a protest against Japanese colonial rule broke out in the area as part of the June Tenth Movement. In recent years, the park has hosted an annual memorial ceremony for the June Tenth Movement in the park.

In August 1994, the Seoul Metropolitan Government and Ssangyong Construction began construction on the park. The park opened on June 30, 1997.
