= Bak Yeong-hee =

South Korean voice actress

Bak Yeong-hee (Korean: 박영희; born November 27, 1959, in Busan) is a South Korean voice actress who joined the Munhwa Broadcasting Corporation's Voice Acting Division in 1982, which is fan club headquartered in Goyang, Gyeonggi-do, South Korea.

== Roles ==
=== Broadcast TV ===
- Ojamajo Doremi (Magical Remi from 1st - 3rd Series, Korea TV Edition, MBC and TV Special of Korea Edition, Tooniverse)
- Mirmo! (Mirmo Pong Pong Pong, Korea TV Edition, SBS)
- CSI: Miami (replacing Sofia Milos by season 2–3, Korea TV Edition, MBC)
- Buffy the Vampire Slayer (replacing Charisma Carpenter, Korea TV Edition, MBC)
- MacGyver (Korea TV Edition, MBC)
- Miracle Girls (Korea TV Edition, MBC)
- Time Adventure (Korea TV Edition, MBC)
- Knight Boy Ramu (Korea TV Edition, MBC)
- Adventure King's Gulliver (Korea TV Edition, MBC)
- Robinhood Adventure (Korea TV Edition, MBC)
- Escaplowne (Korea TV Edition, SBS)
- Minky (Korea TV Edition, SBS)
- El Hazard (Korea TV Edition, Tooniverse)
- Chun Chie in Love (Korea TV Edition, Tooniverse)
- Lupang (Korea TV Edition, Tooniverse)

=== Film dubbing ===
- Star Wars (replacing Carrie Fisher, Korea TV Edition, MBC)
- Autumn in New York (replacing Winona Ryder, Korea TV Edition, MBC)
- The Butterfly Effect (replacing Melora Walters, Korea TV Edition, MBC)
- Elf (replacing Mary Steenburgen, Korea TV Edition, MBC)
- Chicago (replacing Renée Zellweger, Korea TV Edition, MBC)

== See also ==
- Munhwa Broadcasting Corporation
- MBC Voice Acting Division
