= Royal Consort Inmok Deok-Bi =

Goryeo consort (fl. 11th century)

Virtuous Consort Inmok 인목덕비
- Born: Unknown; Gyeongju, Goryeo
- Died: 1094; Goryeo
- Spouse: Munjong of Goryeo (m. 1049; died 1083)
- Issue: An unnamed daughter
Regnal name
- Princess Sunghwa (숭화궁주; 崇化宮主)
Posthumous name
- Inmok (인목, 仁穆; "Benevolent and Majestic")
- House: Gyeongju Gim (by birth); House of Wang (by marriage)
- Father: Gim Won-chung
- Religion: Buddhism

Royal Consort Inmok of the Gyeongju Gim clan (Korean: 인목덕비 김씨; Hanja: 仁穆德妃 金氏; lit. 'Virtuous Consort Inmok of the Gyeongju Gim clan'; d. 1094) or during her lifetime was called as Princess Sunghwa (Korean: 숭화궁주; Hanja: 崇化宮主) was the 5th wife of King Munjong of Goryeo.

She was born in Gyeongju as the daughter of Gim Won-chung (김원충), son of Gim In-wi (김인위), while her older sister became Jeongjong of Goryeo's 4th wife. In 1049 (3rd year reign of Munjong of Goryeo), she was chosen to be his 5th wife and they get married not long after that, then received her royal title as Princess Sunghwa (숭화궁주; 崇化宮主). They initially had a daughter, but died too early after birth. Meanwhile, she later died in 1094 (11th year of the reign of Seonjong of Goryeo) and received her posthumous name of Virtuous Consort Inmok (인목덕비; 仁穆德妃).
