= June Tenth Movement =

1926 protest against colonial rule in Korea

- Part of the Korean independence movement
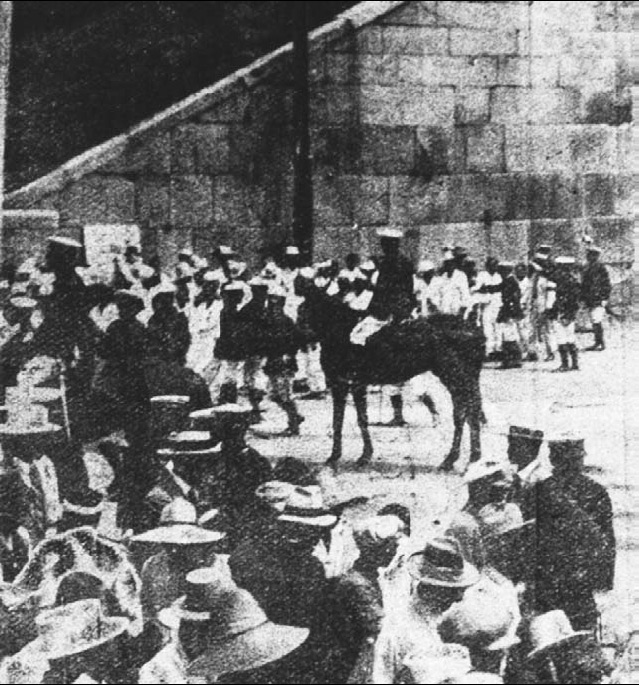
- A Japanese soldier on horseback during the protest (1926)
- Date: June 10, 1926
- Location: Mainly Keijō, also student strikes around Korea
- Caused by: the death of Sunjong of Korea and inspiration from the March First Movement
- Goals: Secure Korea's independence; Gain international support
- Methods: Nonviolent resistance
- Result: Suppression

Parties
Korean independence activists	Government-General of Chōsen

Number
Several hundred	At least 7,000

Casualties
- Arrested: Around 200

The June Tenth Movement (Korean: 6·10만세운동; Hanja: 六十萬歲運動) was a 1926 student protest primarily held in Keijō (Seoul), Korea against Japanese colonial rule.

== Background ==
From 1910 to 1945, Korea was a colony of the Empire of Japan. In 1919, the March First Movement peaceful protests caused a spike in the Korean independence movement, particularly amongst the Korean diaspora. However, by 1926, the independence movement had encountered a lull. Japan quelled international pressure to reform (in part via its cultural rule policies), the Korean Provisional Government in Shanghai was encountering difficulties, and Korean militant resistance in Manchuria had peaked in 1921. Furthermore, the divisions between the political left and right in Korea intensified.

On April 26, 1926, the former Emperor of Korea Sunjong died. As the March First Movement had occurred in the wake of the death of Sunjong's father Gojong, the Japanese military braced for a similar wave of protests. It gathered 7,000 soldiers in Keijō (Seoul), and anchored its fleet in Busan and Incheon.

Regardless of the circumstances, Korean students planned protests for the beginning of Sunjong's public funeral: June 10. As Japanese attention was often focused on established independence activists, the activities of students possibly went less detected.

Various student groups planned and prepared their own protests for the day. This includes students of predecessors to the modern Yonsei University and Korea University. For example, on June 8, a number of Koreans prepared flags and declarations of independence from Japan. They then had 10,000 copies of their declarations printed via a printing press normally used for the newspaper Shidae Ilbo.

== Description ==
On June 10, 1926, Sunjong's funeral procession began marching in Seoul, from the former palace Changdeokgung to the tomb Hongneung. Around 8:30 am, as the procession passed by Dansungsa, around 300 high school students began shouting "long live Korean independence!" (조선독립만세) and handing out fliers. At various points during day, more student groups held similar protests.

Crowds joined in the protests, but the heavy Japanese police presence lead to quick suppression. During the protests, around 210 students were arrested in Seoul, and 1,000 total were arrested around the peninsula. Around 53 ended up imprisoned.

The protest was mostly limited to Seoul, although news of it spread around Korea. Students around across the Korean peninsula, including in Chongju, Ulsan, Gunsan, Pyongyang, Gongju, Jeonju, among other places, stayed home from school in solidarity with the protestors in Seoul.

== Aftermath ==
Arrests continued through June and into July.

In Shanghai, the Korean Provisional Government (KPG) monitored the progression of the protest. They invited Kim Dan-ya, a leader in the protest movement, to speak in front of around 150 people in Shanghai.

== Legacy ==
The movement was followed by the 1929 Gwangju Student Independence Movement.

On December 8, 2020, the South Korean government designated June 10th as a national for commemoration throughout the country of the June Tenth Movement. The 2023 commemoration took place in Hullyeonwon Park, site of Sunjong's funeral where the 1926 protests took place.
