= Queen Inye =

Queen consort of Goryeo (1026–1092)

Queen Inye 인예왕후

Queen consort of Goryeo
- Tenure: 1052–1083
- Coronation: 1052
- Predecessor: Queen Inpyeong
- Successor: Royal Consort Jeongsin

Queen dowager of Goryeo
- Tenure: 1083–1092
- Coronation: 1083
- Predecessor: Queen Dowager Heonae
- Successor: Queen Dowager Sasuk
- Monarch: King Seonjong (son)
- Born: 1026; Goryeo
- Died: 5 October 1092 (aged 66); Seogyeong, Goryeo
- Burial: Daereung tomb
- Spouse: Munjong of Goryeo (before 1047)
- Issue: Sons: Wang Hun Wang Un Wang Ong Wang Hu Wang Su Wang Taeng Wang Bi Wang Eum Wang Chim Wang Gyeong; Daughters: Princess Jeokgyeong Princess Boryeong 2 unnamed daughters
Regnal name
- Princess Yeondeok (연덕궁주; 延德宮主); Consort Yeondeok (연덕궁비; 延德宮妃); Queen Mother Inyesundeok (인예순덕태후; 仁睿順德太后); Grand Queen Mother Inye (인예왕태후; 仁睿王太后)
Posthumous name
- Queen Mother Seongseon Hyomok Inye Sundeok 성선효목인예순덕태후 (聖善孝穆仁睿順德太后)
- House: Gyeongwon Yi clan
- Father: Yi Ja-yeon
- Mother: Lady Kim of the Gyeongju Kim clan
- Religion: Buddhism

Queen Inye of the Gyeongwon Yi clan (Korean: 인예왕후 이씨; Hanja: 仁睿王后 李氏; 1026 – 5 October 1092 (Note: In the Korean calendar (lunisolar), she died on 2nd day of the 9th month of 1092.)) or Queen Mother Inyesundeok (Korean: 인예순덕태후; Hanja: 仁睿順德太后) was a Korean queen consort as the 2nd wife of Munjong of Goryeo and the first Goryeo queen who came from the powerful Gyeongwon Yi clan. Among her ten sons, three of the eldest became the reign kings (Sunjong, Seonjong, Sukjong) and three others became a Buddhist monk. She was the grandmother of Heonjong and Yejong, also ancestors of all goryeo kings after her husband.

== Biography ==
=== Early life and background ===
The future Queen Inye was born as part of the powerful Gyeongwon Yi clan. Her father was its leader, Yi Ja-yeon (이자연; 李子淵) and her mother was the daughter of Kim In-wi (김인위; 金因渭) from the Gyeongju Kim clan. As the first and oldest daughter, she had 8 brothers and 2 younger sisters who both would become King Munjong's wives, Consort Ingyeong and Consort Injeol.

=== Marriage and palace life ===
Lady Yi was married to King Munjong of Goryeo as his second wife and honoured as Princess Yeondeok (연덕궁주; 延德宮主) since she stayed in "Yeondeok Palace" (연덕궁; 延德宮) and sometimes called as Consort Yeondeok (연덕궁비; 延德宮妃). They had their first son in 1047 and two years later, she gave birth into their second son and formally became the queen consort in 1052, which this event was celebrated by many provinces. Beside that, she also bore Munjong 8 other sons and 4 daughters, but two of their daughters died too early. Her position was further consolidated upon her eldest son crowned as the crown prince in 1054.

In 1083, her husband died and their eldest son ascended the throne as Sunjong of Goryeo. However, the new king was said to be very grieved for his father's death and died not long after that, which he was succeeded by his younger brother, Seonjong of Goryeo. In 1083, the king formally honoured his mother as 'the queen mother' (태후; 太后) after bestowed the Queen Dowager Palace (왕태후궁; 王太后宮) to her and congratulatory messages were sent from each province along with a whopping 100,000 pieces of cloth were given to her. Also, it was said that Tamna Province sent some envoy as a tribute to the royal palace. Since this, she lived in "Jasu Hall" (자수전; 慈壽殿) until her death.

=== Efforts in Buddhism ===
The queen was said to personally like and always practiced Buddhism, as she was a devout Buddhist during her lifetime. She also prayed for the prosperity of her descendants at "Gamro Temple" (감로사; 甘露寺), which was built by her father.

She built "Gukcheong Temple" (국청사; 國淸寺) in 1089 and delighted to hear about Jeontaegyo (천태교) from her fourth son. In addition, she transcribed the Yugahyeonyangron (유가현양론; 瑜伽顯揚論) into the silver book (은서; 銀書) and later finished by King Sukjong. In 1090, she went to the Three Horned Mountain (삼각산; 三角山) along with King Seonjong to visited Seunggagul (승가굴) and "Insu Temple" (인수사), came to "Sinhyeol Temple" (신혈사; 神穴寺) and participated in "500 Buddhist Ceremony" (오백나한재; 五百羅漢齋).

=== Death and after life ===
Meanwhile, the queen mother died in Seogyeong (서경; 西京) on 5 October 1092 (9th years reign of King Seonjong) and her body was transported back to Gaegyeong to buried in Daereung Tomb (대릉; 戴陵).

Her works for Buddhist, which had been vigorously promoted, was completed by her 3rd and 4th son after her death. In 1096, King Sukjong held a Doryang (도량; 道場) for three days at the Geondeok Hall (건덕전; 乾德殿) and read the entire Avatamsaka Sutra, which initiated and completed by his late mother. When Gukcheong temple was completed a year later, King Sukjong himself opened the Gyeongchandoryang (경찬도량; 慶讚道場) and wrote the Gyeongchansi (경찬시; 慶讚詩) to respond Yusin (유신; 儒臣).

=== Honors ===
After her death, she was posthumously honoured as Queen Mother Inye Sundeok (인예순덕태후; 仁睿順德太后) or shortly Queen Mother Inye (인예태후; 仁睿太后) by King Seonjong of Goryeo.

Under his command too, Banhon Hall (반혼전; 返魂殿) was built at Gukcheong Temple for her and she was enshrined in her husband's shrine. According to the "Anthology of Daegak National Preceptor" (대각국사문집; 大覺國師文集), she was called as National Mother Inye (인예국모; 仁睿國母; "The Benevolent and Perspicacious National Mother").

In April 1140 (18th year reign of King Injong), she received name Seong-seon (성선; 聖善) and Hyo-mok (효목; 孝穆) in October 1253 (40th year reign of King Gojong) as her full Posthumous name.

According to her death records, she was said to have a big heart and personality, docile, gentleness, and her virtuous conduct was no less than that of a famous ancient master. Records also said she became the person who opened the Gyeongwon Yi clan era by achieved harmony in her relationship with her husband, having prospered descendants, and adept in her duty as the mother of the nation, which peoples admired her much.
