= Wang T'aeng =

Korean prince (fl. 12th century)

- Dosaeng seungtong or Boeung seungtong 도생승통(道生僧統) or 보응승통(普應僧統)
- Died: c.1112 Geoje-hyeon, Gyeongsang-do, Goryeo
Names
- Wang T'aeng (왕탱; 王竀); Wang Kyu (왕규; 王規); Wang Chŏng (왕정; 王靖)
- House: Wang
- Father: Munjong of Goryeo
- Mother: Queen Inye of the Inju Yi clan
- Religion: Buddhism

Wang T'aeng (Korean: 왕탱; Hanja: 王竀; died c.1112) was a Goryeo Royal Prince as the sixth son of King Munjong and Queen Inye, also a Buddhist monk under the name Dosaeng (as Wang T'aeng) and/or Boeung (as Wang Kyu).

In 1070, under his father, King Munjong's command, Wang shaved his hair and became a monk by starting a new life in Solli Temple (속리사) before went to Hyeonhwa Temple in Gaegyeong and became the disciple of his maternal uncle, Sohyŏn (소현). Then, he served as an abbot in Beopju Temple. In 1084, Wang repaired the Bokcheon Hermitage (복천암 극락보전) and served as an abbot in Geumsan Temple following Sohyŏn's death in 1095, even contributed for the temple's development and maintenance. Since he was able to do this, Wang was believed to have a lot of wealth throughout his lifetime and gave it generously to others.

In 1112 (7th years reign of his nephew), some people reported that Wang, along with Kim In-sŏk (김인석), Yi Yŏ-rim (이여림), Ha Ŏn-sŏk (하언석), Im Sin-haeng (임신행), and many others were plotting a treason. They then exiled to Geoje and those who were involved (even Kim, Yi, Ha, Im's sons were exiled and decapitated midway), so Wang was also considered to died at this time too.
