= Duke Daewon =

Korean prince (1903–1161)

Prince of Goryeo
- Coronation: 1106 (as marquess); 1114 (as duke)
- Born: Wang Hyo; 1093; Goryeo
- Died: 1161 (aged 69); Goryeo
- Burial: Uiryong Mountain
- Spouse: Lady Yi (m. 1115)
- Issue: Wang Ham; Duke Jeongui's wife
Posthumous name
- Jangpyeong (장평, 莊平; "Solemn and Peaceful")
- House: House of Wang
- Father: Sukjong of Goryeo
- Mother: Queen Myeongui of the Chŏngju Yu clan

Korean name
- Hangul: 왕효
- Hanja: 王侾
- RR: Wang Hyo
- MR: Wang Hyo

Royal title
- Hangul: 대원공, 대원후
- Hanja: 大原公, 大原侯
- RR: Daewongong, Daewonhu
- MR: Taewŏn'gong, Taewŏnhu

Courtesy name
- Hangul: 경천
- Hanja: 敬天
- RR: Gyeongcheon
- MR: Kyŏngch'ŏn

Posthumous name
- Hangul: 장평
- Hanja: 莊平
- RR: Jangpyeong
- MR: Changp'yŏng

Duke Daewon or Marquess Daewon (1093–1161 (Note: In the Korean calendar (lunisolar), he died on 10th day of the 4th month of 1161.)), personal name Wang Hyo was a Goryeo Royal Prince as the fifth son of Sukjong of Goryeo and Queen Myeongui.

== Biography ==
In 1102, he firstly received his name, "Hyo" (효; 侾) and was said to especially favored by his father which he said:

Prince of the Yeondeok Palace was intelligent and wise from birth, loyal and filial in nature, so now I give you the name "Hyo" under a secret order.
_{연덕궁(延德宮)의 왕자인 그대는 나면서부터 총명하고 슬기롭고 성품이 충성되고 효성스러우므로, 이제 밀명(密命)을 내려 효(侾)라는 이름을 지어주노라.}

Wang Hyo was then given silverware (은그릇), silk (비단), artillery (포화), grain (곡식), and a saddled horse (안장). The king also said:

Although I have many children, only this child(refer to Hyo) is filial. Since children are supposed to take filial piety as their foundation, they were named "Hyo" after adding filial piety next to "In".
_{자녀가 비록 많지만 이 아이만이 효자라오. 자식은 효를 근본으로 삼아야 하는 것이므로 사람 인(人)변에 효(孝)를 더한 글자로 이름을 지어준 것이오.}

After his father's death, the young prince Hyo lived with his mother in the Yeondeok Palace (연덕궁; 延德宮), which from there he was called as Young Prince of the Yeondeok Palace (연덕궁왕자; 延德宮王子). He formally became a marquess on the 2nd months of 1106 along with received "2,000 sik-eup" (2천호 식읍) and "300 sik-sil" (3백호 식실). A year later, his brother moved to Seogyeong, ordered Yun Kwan and O Yeon-chong (오연총) to conquered the Jurchens while Hyo stayed in the capital to protect the royal family and appointed as Geomgyotaebo (검교태보) in 1108. Then, in 1110, Hyo became Gwanghyogongsin Sutaewi (광효공신 수태위) and was given his mother's residence–Myeongbok Palace (명복궁; 明福宮) during her lifetime under the king's command in 1113. A year later, he became a duke and married the oldest daughter of Duke Yanggan (양간공; 襄簡公) on the 3rd months of 1115, also became a Taebo (태보) in 1122 by received silk (비단), goldware (금은그릇), and horse (말) through Choe Hong-jae (최홍재).

However, not long after Yi Cha-gyŏm came to the power, both Wang Hyo and Wang Bo were exiled to Gyeongsan-bu (now Seongju County, North Gyeongsang Province). In 1129, Wang Hyo was able to back to Gaegyeong and his nephew, King Injong made him held his former position again and gave him "3,500 sik-eup" (3천5백호 식읍) and "500 sik-sil" (5백호 식실), along with a new house, silk (비단), goldware (금은그릇), and horse (말). Four years later, in 1133, his wife died. Later on, Wang Hyo died at the age of 69 in 1161 and his mortuary was built at Gwangje Temple (광제사; 廣濟寺). He was given a Posthumous name, Jangpyeong (장평; 莊平) and cremated on the 28th days at the foot of a hill. His remains were placed in "Inhyobulwon" (인효불원; 因孝佛院) for a while until his funeral was held at the eastern foot of the Uiryong Mountain on the 11th months.
