= Yun Jeong-mo =

South Korean writer (born 1946)

Yun Jeong-Mo (born 1946) is a South Korean writer. She was born in Wolseong, North Gyeongsang Province, and graduated Hyehwa Girls’ High School in Busan. She studied creative writing and literature at Seorabeol Art University, during which she wrote her first novel Munuijyeo buneun baram (무늬져 부는 바람 Winds Filled with Patterns). The novel was published in 1968, quickly followed by a number of other works: Geuraedo deulyeogen hetsari (그래도 들녘엔 햇살이 Still There Is Sunshine on the Fields) in 1972, Saengui yeoroeseo (생의 여로에서 On the Road of Life's Journey) in 1973, and Jeo barami kkotnipeul (저 바람이 꽃잎을 Flower Petals in That Wind) in 1973. Her 1981 novella Barambyeokui ttaldeul (바람벽의 딸들 Daughters of the Wall) won the Yeoseong Joongang Contest. In 1988, she received the Sin Dong-yup Grant for Creative Writing and the Danjae Literature Prize. Her recent works include the short story collections Sumerian (수메리안 Sumerian) and Gilgamesh (길가메시 Gilgamesh), which were published in 2005 and 2007, respectively. She also has a fan page.

== Life ==
Yun was born in Wolseong, North Gyeongsang Province, in 1946. She grew up under the influence of her uncles at her maternal grandparents’ home, to which she had followed her mother when her parents divorced. She attended Hyehwa Girls’ High School in Busan and studied creative writing under novelist Kim Dong-ni at Seorabeol Art University. She began writing in earnest, and in 1968 her first novel Munuijyeo buneun baram (무늬져 부는 바람 Winds Filled with Patterns) was published. After graduating university, she worked as a proofreader for several publishers. She made her official literary debut when Barambyeokui ttaldeul (바람벽의 딸들 Daughters of the Wall) won the Yeoseong Joongang Contest in the Novella category.

In May 1980, Hong Hee-dam, author of Gitbal (깃발 Flag) and a member of a women's organization in Gwangju, asked Yun to hide two Gwangju Uprising activists wanted by the government and offered a monthly payment of KRW 200,000 in return. Struggling to make ends meet, she accepted. She ended up learning a lot about history and society from the two activists, as she would later confess. Experiencing the Gwangju Uprising both directly and indirectly, Yun began to explore the sad history of the Korean people, the reality of the peninsula's division, class struggles, and the plight of women. The rage and defiance she felt towards the Gwangju Uprising were channeled into creative expression, resulting in novels that are now representative of South Korea in the 1980s. Examples include Deungnamu (등나무 Wisteria, 1983), Bamgil (밤길 Night Road, 1985), Nim (님 Thee, 1985), and Goppi (고삐 Reins, 1988).

Since the 1990s, Yun has written novels that reflect a broader view of history and reality. These novels deal with topics ranging from the concerns of farming communities to the life of Yun I-sang (a South Korean-born composer who defected to Germany) to the tragic realities of Korea and Ireland. Recently, she adapted her 1982 novel Emi ireumeun josenppiyeotda (에미 이름은 조센삐였다 Your Ma's Name Was Chosun Whore) into a play entitled Bongseonhwa (봉선화 Touch-me-not). These two works raise the issue of Korean “comfort women” forced into sexual slavery for Japanese soldiers during World War II.

== Writing ==
Since the 1980 Gwangju Uprising, Yun has shifted her literary focus to social criticism. In particular, she has probed in depth the tragic national experience of colonization, the division of Korea, and conflicts between the rich and poor, among others.

This artistic vision is evident in many of her works: the novella Emi ireumeun josenppiyeotda (에미 이름은 조센삐였다 Your Ma's Name Was Chosun Whore) tells the story of women sexually enslaved by Japanese troops during the late colonial period; Seom (섬 Island), later revised to Geurigo hamseongi deulyeotda (그리고 함성이 들렸다 And Then We Heard the Roar), chronicles the struggles of lepers during Japanese occupation; Goppi (고삐 Reins) investigates the relationship between foreign rule and the commercialization of sex; and Nabiui kkum (나비의 꿈 A Butterfly's Dream) illustrates the unfortunate interplay between a nation's fate and an artist's achievements by following the life of Korean-born German composer Yun I-sang.

Given that these works were written based on Yun's firsthand experience and research, they are grounded in historical accuracy. They have also been recognized for literary merit due to their vividness of portrayal and expression. Since the 2000s, Yun has closely studied the Sumer civilization, based on which she wrote Sumerian (수메리안, 2005), Gilgamesh (길가메시, 2007), and Sumer (수메르, 2010).

== Works ==
=== Novels ===
- 『저 바람이 꽃잎을』, 동민문화사, 1972.

Flower Petals in That Wind. Dongminmunhwasa, 1972.

- 『무늬져 부는 바람』, 오륜출판사, 1973.

Winds Filled with Patterns. Oryun, 1973.

- 『그래도 들녘엔 햇살이』, 범우사, 1973.

Still There Is Sunshine on the Fields. Bumwoosa, 1973.

- 『생의 여로에서』, 고려문화사, 1973.

On the Road of Life’s Journey. Goyreomunhwasa, 1973.

- 『13월의 송가』, 집현각, 1975.

Ode of the Thirteenth Month. Jiphyeongak, 1975.

- 『광화문통 아이』, 서음출판사, 1976.

The Child on Gwanghwamun Street. Seoeumchulpansa, 1976.

- 『관계』, 서음출판사, 1977.

Relationship. Seoeumchulpansa, 1977.

- 『독사의 혼례』, 지소림, 1978.

Viper's Wedding. Jisorim, 1978.

- 『너의 성숙은 거짓이다』, 산하, 1980.

Your Maturity Is False. Sanha, 1980.

- 『밤길』, 문예출판사, 1983.

Night Road. Moonye Books, 1983.

- 『섬』, 한마당, 1983.

Island. Hanmadang, 1983.

- 『가자, 우리의 둥지로』, 문예사, 1985.

Let's Go, to Our Nest. Moonyesa, 1985.

- 『그리고 함성이 들렸다』, 실천문학사, 1986.

And Then We Heard the Roar. Silcheon Munhak, 1986.

- 『님』, 한겨례, 1987.

Thee. Hanibook, 1987.

- 『빛』, 동아, 1991.

Light. Donga, 1991.

- 『들』, 창작과비평사, 1992.

Field. Changbi, 1992.

- 『고삐』, 풀빛, 1993.

Reigns. Pulbit, 1993.

- 『고삐2』, 풀빛, 1993

Reigns 2. Pulbit, 1993.

- 『봄비』, 풀빛, 1994.

Spring Rain. Pulbit, 1994.

- 『굴레』, 인문당, 1994.

Bridle. Inmundang, 1994.

- 『나비의 꿈』, 한길사, 1996.

A Butterfly’s Dream. Hangilsa, 1996.

- 『에미 이름은 조센삐였다』, 당대, 1997.

Your Ma's Name Was Chosun Whore. Dangdae, 1997.

- 『그들의 오후』, 창작과비평사, 1998.

Their Afternoon. Changbi, 1998.

- 『딴 나라 여인』, 열림원, 1999.

Foreign Woman. Yolimwon, 1999.

- 『슬픈 아일랜드』, 1-2, 열림원, 2000.

Sad Island Vol. 1-2. Yolimwon, 2000.

- 『꾸야삼촌』, 다리미디어, 2002.

Uncle Kkuya. Dari Media, 2002.

- 『수메리안』 1-2, 파미르, 2005.

Sumerian Vol. 1-2. Pamir, 2005.

- 『길가메시』, 파미르, 2007.

Gilgamesh. Pamir, 2007.

- 『수메르』 1-3, 다산책방, 2010.

Sumer Vol. 1-2. Dasanchekbang, 2010.

=== Essay collections ===
- 『황새울 편지』, 푸른숲, 1990.

Letters from Hwangseul. Prunsoop, 1990.

- 『우리는 특급열차를 타러 간다』, 눈과마음, 2001.

We're Off to Take the Express Train, Nungwamaeum, 2001.

=== Other ===
- 『전쟁과 소년』, 푸른나무, 2003.

The War and the Boy. Purunnamu, 2003.

- 『누나의 오월』, 산하, 2005.

Nuna' May. Sanha, 2005.

- 『봉선화가 필 무렵』, 푸른나무, 2008.

When Rose Balsams Bloom. Purunnamu, 2008.

- 『수난 사대』, 웃는돌고래, 2015.

Tragedy over Four Generations. Smiling Dolphin, 2015.

=== Works in translation ===
- Father and Son : Volume 077 (English)
- Meine Mutter war einen "Korea-Nutte" (German)
- 母・従軍慰安婦- かあさんは「朝鮮ピー」と呼ばれた (Japanese)

== Awards ==
- 1988: Sin Dong-yup Grant for Creative Writing
- 1993: Danjae Literature Prize
- 1996: Seorabol Literature Prize
