= Yoon Mi-rim =

South Korean voice actress (1933–2020)

- Born: 1933
- Died: 16 May 2020 (aged 86–87)
- Occupations: Voice actress; writer

Yoon Mi-rim (Korean: 윤미림; Hanja: 尹美林; 1933 – 16 May 2020) was a South Korean voice actress on radio and writer of essays, novels and short stories. She was a voice actor in the Army Broadcast Room in the Jeon Hoon Department of the Ministry of National Defense before passing an examination to work for the Korean Broadcasting System, appearing in several works and performances such as the radio melodrama soap opera Cheongsil Hongsil. Yoon began working in writing from 1996, authoring and publishing works.

== Biography ==
Yoon was born in South Korea in 1933. She graduated from the Department of Korean Literature of the Kyung Hee University with a degree in Western Philosophy before subsequently matriculation to each of the Graduate School of Philosophy at Dongguk University and the Graduate School of Philosophy at Sangji University. Yoon worked as a voice actor at the Army Broadcasting Room in the Jeong Hoon Department of the Ministry of National Defense in August 1954. Four months later, she passed the first broadcast drama research recruitment examination to become a voice actor for Korean Broadcasting System, alongside Ko Eun-jung and Oh Seung-ryong.

In 1955, Yoon made her debut as a voice actress for the Seoul Central Broadcasting Station and held the position for the following thirteen years. During the period when television was not a popular format medium, she appeared in several works and took part in performances playing lively women aged between their teenage years and their twenties. Such works for Yoon included the first ever Korean radio melodrama soap opera Cheongsil Hongsi in 1956. She won the Broadcast Culture Award in 1967, and stepped down from voice acting in the same year.

In 1970, she relocated to Japan to study Western Philosophy, after coming across the complete collections of works from the French novelist and pacifist Romain Rolland while in Myeong-dong and assistance from the Tokyo Publishing House. Yoon later returned to South Korea, settling in Wonju, Gangwon Province in 1993, and establishing a career in writing, publishing essays and novels. From 1996, she authored 15 short stories and novels. She died on the morning of 16 May 2020.
