= Pyŏlmuban =

Goryeo-era Korean army unit

- Hangul: 별무반
- Hanja: 別武班
- RR: Byeolmuban
- MR: Pyŏlmuban

Pyŏlmuban is the name of a special army unit in the time of Korea's Goryeo Dynasty (918–1392). The word pyŏl means of special. Founding of the army was initiated by Yun Kwan during the reign of king Sukjong of Goryeo.

The army was put together to fight the Jurchen who were putting pressure on Goryeo's northern borders. The Goryeo infantry had a hard time resisting the strong Jurchen cavalry.

== Organization ==
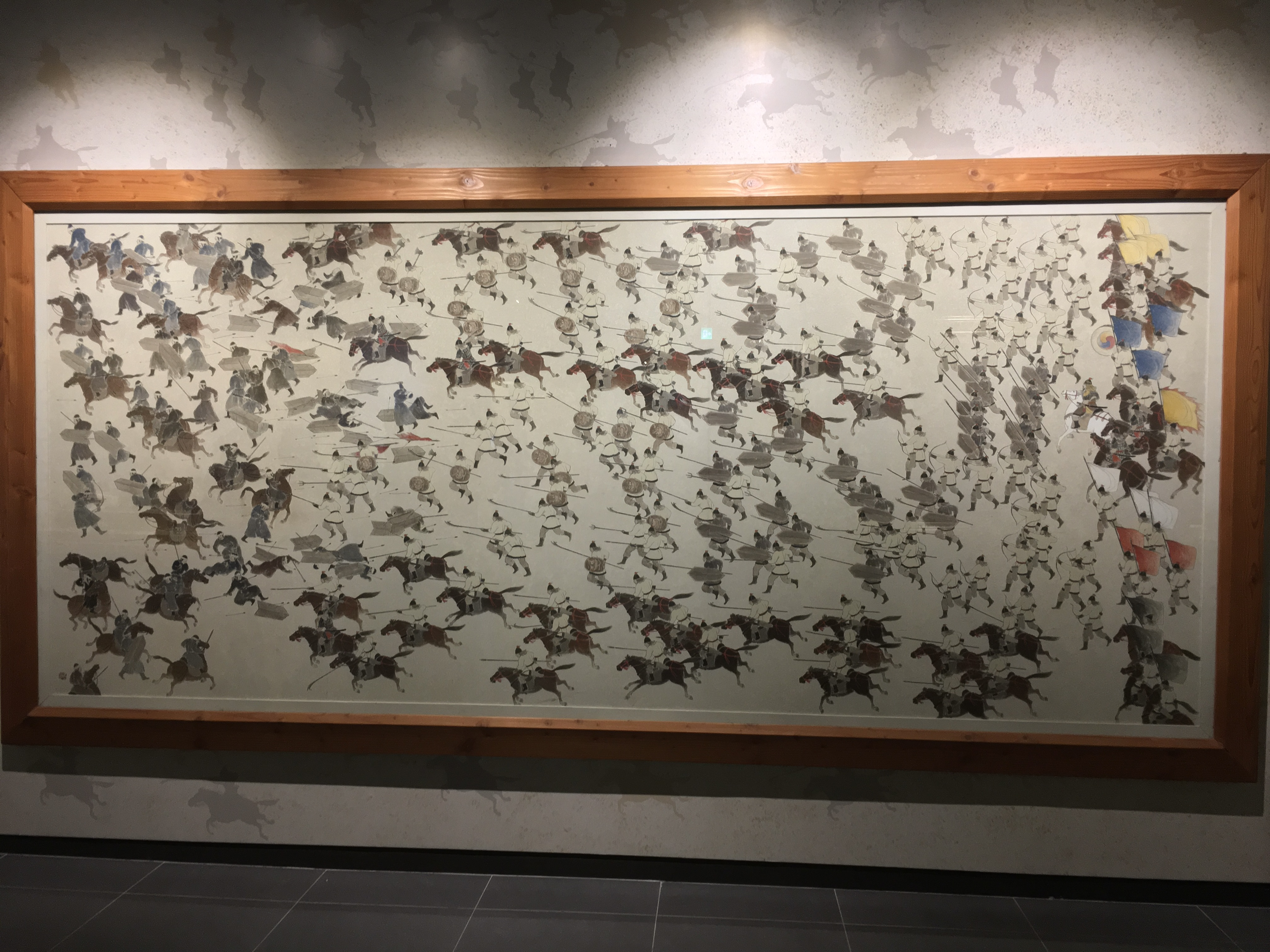
Pyŏlmuban routing the Jurchens.

The Pyŏlmuban army had six divisions: Yun Kwan's regular army and Armor Guards called chŏnggyugun (정규군, 正規軍) Infantry called Sinbogun (신보군, 神步軍), Cavalry called Sin'gigun (신기군, 神騎軍), an army of Buddhist monks called Hangmagun (항마군, 降魔軍), Supporting troop made of slaves called Yŏnhogun (연호군,烟戶軍), and volunteered soldiers made of merchants and ordinary citizens called Chubugunhyŏn (주부군현, 州府郡縣).

Combating troops were divided into Assassin/Spies called Sinbo (신보, 神步), Siege Engineers called Tot'ang (도탕, 跳蕩), Archers called Kyŏnggung (경궁, 梗弓), Builders called Chŏngno (정노, 精弩), Ballistic/Cannon gunners called Palhwa (발화, 發火), and special force called T'ŭgibudae (특기부대, 特技部隊). They were to be trained and maintain/make weapons & fight with regular army.

During the second year of king Yejong of Goryeo's reign the Pyŏlmuban, consisting of 170,000 soldiers, attacked Jurchen and killed approximately 5,000 Jurchen troops, detained another 5,000 POWs, burned 135 villages, and captured 350 Jurchen tribal clans and took over their territory by building nine fortresses at Hamju region.

Fortresses were called Northeastern Nine Fortresses, and they are in Hamju (함주, 咸州), Yŏngju (영주, 英州), Ungju (웅주, 雄州), Pokju (복주, 福州), Kilju (길주, 吉州), Konghŏmjin, (공험진, 公咽鎭), Sungnyŏng (숭녕, 崇寧), T'ongt'ae (통태, 通泰), and Chinyang (진양, 眞陽).

However internal trouble at the Goryeo court later forced the Goryeo army to leave Jurchen territory just after few years.
