= Yun Chae-ok =

Korean-born scientist

- Born: 9 May 1963 (age 63); Busan, South Korea

Academic background
- Education: Illinois Institute of Technology
- Thesis: Isolation and characterization of R̲h̲o̲d̲o̲c̲o̲c̲c̲u̲s̲ Sp. strain IGTS8 promoters and functional analysis of 16S rRNA promoters from R̲h̲o̲d̲o̲c̲o̲c̲c̲u̲s̲ and E̲. C̲o̲l̲i̲ in homologous and heterologous systems (1996)

Yun Chae-ok (Korean: 윤채옥; born 9 May 1963) is a South Korean scientist and professor of Bioengineering at Hanyang University.

== Biography and education ==
Yun received her Bachelor of Science in biology in 1986 and in 1988 her Master of Science in biology, both in Sogang University, located in Seoul. She finished her Ph.D. in Cell and Molecular Biology in 1996 at the Illinois Institute of Technology. She continued her postdoctoral education at Harvard Medical School, for 2 years, and moved back to Korea in 2000.

== Research ==
Her research interests approach cancer gene therapy, immunotherapy, angiogenesis, the combination of viral with non-viral vectors, nanomedicine, and tumor biology.

== Selected publications ==
- Fukumura D, Gohongi T, Kadambi A, Izumi Y, Ang J, Yun CO, Buerk DG, Huang PL, Jain RK. The predominant role of endothelial nitric oxide synthase in vascular endothelial growth factor-induced angiogenesis and vascular permeability. Proceedings of the National Academy of Sciences. 2001 Feb 27;98(5):2604-9.
- Kim JH, Lee YS, Kim H, Huang JH, Yoon AR, Yun CO. Relaxin expression from tumor-targeting adenoviruses and its intratumoral spread, apoptosis induction, and efficacy. Journal of the National Cancer Institute. 2006 Oct 18;98(20):1482-93.
- Yoo JY, Kim JH, Kwon YG, Kim EC, Kim NK, Choi HJ, Yun CO. VEGF-specific short hairpin RNA–expressing oncolytic adenovirus elicits potent inhibition of angiogenesis and tumor growth. Molecular Therapy. 2007 Feb 1;15(2):295-302.
- Lee YS, Kim JH, Choi KJ, Choi IK, Kim H, Cho S, Cho BC, Yun CO. Enhanced antitumor effect of oncolytic adenovirus expressing interleukin-12 and B7-1 in an immunocompetent murine model. Clinical cancer research. 2006 Oct 1;12(19):5859-68.
- Son YG, Kim EH, Kim JY, Kim SU, Kwon TK, Yoon AR, Yun CO, Choi KS. Silibinin sensitizes human glioma cells to TRAIL-mediated apoptosis via DR5 up-regulation and down-regulation of c-FLIP and survivin. Cancer research. 2007 Sep 1;67(17):8274-84.

== Honors and awards ==
She was elected to the National Academy of Engineering of Korea.
