= Yun Seok-hee =

Korean association football player

Personal information
- Date of birth: 21 July 1993 (age 33)
- Height: 1.86 m (6 ft 1 in)
- Position: Forward

Team information
- Current team: Pattani

Youth career
- –2014: University of Ulsan

Senior career*
Years	Team	Apps	(Gls)
2015–2016	Goyang Zaicro	6	(2)
2017	Chuncheon		
2017–	Pattani		
- * Club domestic league appearances and goals as of 14:18, 14 July 2020 (UTC)

- Yun Seok-hee
- Hangul: 윤석희
- RR: Yun Seokhui
- MR: Yun Sŏkhŭi

Yun Seok-hee (Korean: 윤석희; born 21 July 1993) is a South Korean footballer who plays as a forward for Pattani.

He scored the fastest goal in the K League 2 against Bucheon FC after 28 seconds.

== Career statistics ==
=== Club ===
As of 14 July 2020.

Club	Season	League			Cup		Other		Total	
Club	Season	Division	Apps	Goals	Apps	Goals	Apps	Goals	Apps	Goals
Goyang Zaicro	2015	K League Challenge	6	2	0	0	0	0	6	2
Goyang Zaicro	2016	K League Challenge	0	0	0	0	0	0	0	0
Goyang Zaicro	Total		6	2	0	0	0	0	6	2
Chuncheon	2017	K3 League	–		1 (Note: Appearances in the Korean FA Cup)	0	0	0	1	0
Career total			6	2	1	0	0	0	7	2
