= Queen Jeongui =

Queen of Goryeo (fl. 10th century)

- Spouse: Sunjong of Goryeo
Posthumous name
- Jeongui (정의, 貞懿; "Chaste and Benign")
- House: House of Wang (by birth and marriage)
- Father: Wang Gi, Duke Pyeongnyang
- Religion: Buddhism

Korean name
- Hangul: 정의왕후
- Hanja: 貞懿王后
- RR: Jeongui wanghu
- MR: Chŏngŭi wanghu

Queen Jeongui of the Gaeseong Wang clan (Korean: 정의왕후 왕씨; Hanja: 貞懿王后 王氏) was a Goryeo royal family member as the granddaughter of King Hyeonjong who became the first wife of her first cousin, King Sunjong. Although most Goryeo queens followed their maternal clan, but since Queen Jeongui didn't change her clan, it was speculated that there were some wrong theory written on the records.
