= Yoon Jong-tae =

Zainichi Korean footballer (born 1998)

Personal information
- Date of birth: 12 February 1998 (age 28)
- Place of birth: Kobe, Hyōgo, Japan
- Height: 1.82 m (5 ft 11 1/2 in)
- Position: Midfielder

Team information
- Current team: Nevėžis

Youth career
- 2013–2016: Kansai University Hokuyo High School
- 2016–2019: International Pacific University

Senior career*
Years	Team	Apps	(Gls)
2019–2021	Daegu FC	4	(0)
2022	Wilpas	6	(3)
2023	SalPa	6	(0)
2023	FC Jazz	13	(1)
2024–	Nevėžis	10	(0)
Korean name
Hangul	윤종태
Hanja	尹鐘太
RR	Yun Jongtae
MR	Yun Chongt'ae
- * Club domestic league appearances and goals as of 31 December 2023

Yoon Jong-tae (Korean: 윤종태; Japanese: 伊藤 鐘太, romanized: Itō Shōta; born 12 February 1998) is a Zainichi Korean football midfielder of South Korean nationality, who plays for Lithuanian club Nevėžis in I Lyga.

== Club career ==
Born in Kobe, Japan on 12 February 1998 as a third-generation Zainichi Korean, Yoon was educated at Kansai University's attached Hokuyo High School and played his youth football for International Pacific University, where he was known as Shota Ito. A midfielder, he joined Daegu FC in July 2019. He made his debut for the club on 26 July 2020, coming on as a late match substitute in a K League 1 match against Busan IPark.

In 2023 Yoon played in the Finnish Ykkönen, at the time the 2nd tier of the country's football league, initially for Salon Palloilijat (SalPa). Later in the year he moved to FC Jazz, which played in the Kakkonen, the 3rd tier Finnish football league.

For the 2024 season, he signed with FK Nevėžis in Lithuania's second-tier I Lyga.

== Career statistics ==
As of 17 June 2024

Club performance			League		Cup (Note: Includes Suomen Cup and Lithuanian Cup)		Continental		Other		Total	
Club	Season	League	Apps	Goals	Apps	Goals	Apps	Goals	Apps	Goals	Apps	Goals
Daegu FC	2019	K League 1	0	0	0	0	0	0	–		0	0
Daegu FC	2020	K League 1	4	0	0	0	–		–		4	0
Daegu FC	2021	K League 1	0	0	0	0	0	0	–		0	0
Wilpas	2022	Nelonen	6	3	–		–		–		6	3
Salon Palloilijat	2023	Ykkönen	6	0	2	0	–		3 (Note: Includes Ykköscup)	1	11	1
FC Jazz	2023	Kakkonen	13	1	0	0	–		–		13	1
Nevėžis	2024	I Lyga	10	0	2	0	–		–		12	0
Career total			39	4	4	0	0	0	3	1	46	5
