= Yoon Suk-min (infielder) =

South Korean baseball player

SK Wyverns – No. --
- Infielder
- Born: September 4, 1985 (age 40); Guri, Gyeonggi, South Korea
- Bats: Right Throws: Right

KBO debut
- September 1, 2004, for the Doosan Bears

KBO statistics (through August 1, 2019)
- Batting average: .289
- Home runs: 100
- Runs batted in: 454

Teams
- Doosan Bears (2004–2007, 2011–2013); Nexen Heroes (2014–2016); KT Wiz (2017–2019); SK Wyverns (2020–present)

Yoon Suk-min (Korean: 윤석민; born September 4, 1985) is a South Korean infielder who plays for the SK Wyverns in the Korea Baseball Organization.

On November 21, 2019, he moved to a 1:1 trade with Huh Do-hwan, then a member of the SK Wyverns.
