= Maria Yoon =

Korean-born American artist and filmmaker

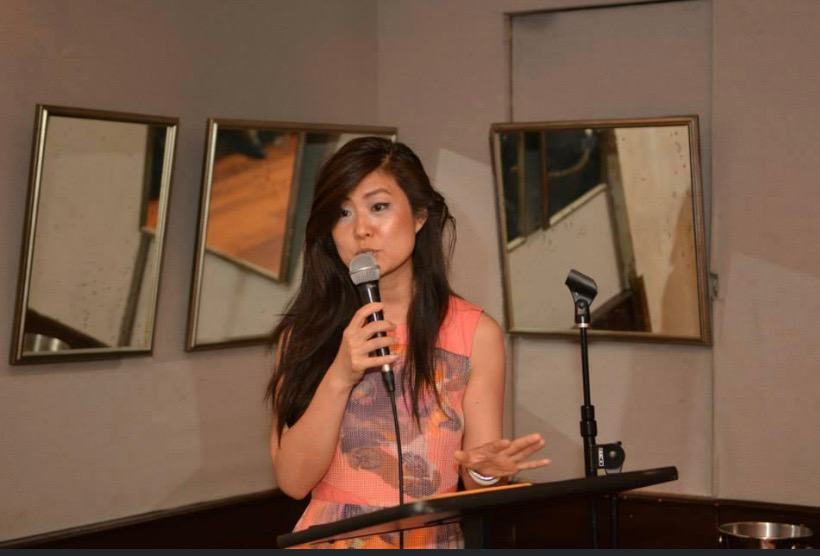
- Born: 1971 (age 54–55); Seoul, South Korea
- Other name: Maria the Korean Bride
- Occupations: Performance artist, filmmaker

Maria Yoon (born 1971), also known as Maria the Korean Bride, is a Korean-born American performance artist and filmmaker. Based in New York City, she is best known for her extended performance art project and film where in the course of nine years, she gets married in all fifty U.S. states, as well as Puerto Rico, the District of Columbia, and the U.S. Virgin Islands.

== Early life and education ==
Born in Seoul, the oldest of three, Yoon's family immigrated to the US when she was seven. She grew up in Queens, the Bronx, and Staten Island, New York, and graduated from Cooper Union with a Bachelor of Fine Arts. She attended Skowhegan School of Painting and Sculpture in 1994.

== Career ==
=== Early work ===
Yoon felt an inordinate pressure from her parents and the Korean American community to marry after turning 30. She first responded by making a calendar full of bachelors who wanted to propose to her to start a conversation with her father. The Marriage Proposal Series 2003 Calendar sold out of its first printing at the New Museum bookstore. Yoon, however, felt the project reinforced stereotypical male roles and since has reflected on its impact. Some of her bachelors include Mr. August, also known as James Luna.

=== Maria the Korean Bride ===
Yoon took the hanbok her mother had given her for her 30th birthday and decided to make a further art project out of it. She started by marrying two people in Las Vegas on a friend's vacation trip. She married in Hawaii in a traditional wedding ceremony. In Detroit, she married an artist dressed as Death. When she experienced racism in Wisconsin, she married a shirt representing the company where she experienced the incident. Her final wedding was held in Times Square in New York City, officiated by Jimmy McMillan, of the Rent is Too Damn High party. Yoon selected her husband from a raffle.

Yoon writes the all vows herself and never smiles out of cultural respect and to honor Korean wedding ceremony custom. She has expressed that Wyoming was her favorite experience in the U.S. for the change of scenery it offered and people's friendliness. Though awarded a number of grants and donations, the project was largely self-funded.

==== Screenings ====
The film version has been screened at ATA Gallery in San Francisco, MTS Gallery in Anchorage, the Manifest in Honolulu, UT Austin, Stony Brook University, and various film festivals like the FEM Cine of Santiago, Chile and in Atlanta, Sarasota, Florida and Naperville, Illinois, among other places. The 2013 New York City premiere, held at the BMCC Tribeca Performing Arts Center, sold out.

==== Responses to the work ====
In Montana, the minister, a recent newlywed, said "She’s asking some really good questions about the institution." In New Hampshire Yoon got lectured by a minister on the project and there have been people who have bowed out of the project because of her support of gay marriage.

==== Ghost weddings ====
After learning about police in northwest China charging a man with murdering two women with mental disabilities, alleging that he wanted to sell their corpses to be used in so-called "ghost weddings" on BBC.com, Yoon took an interest in incorporating the old practice of marrying the dead into her work. In July 2017, after a local Taoist priest had an omen that marrying a deceased man would be unlucky, Yoon married an imaginary husband at a Taoist temple in the Xizhi District of New Taipei City, Taiwan. She wore a pink hanbok with her wrist tied with a red string to a memorial tablet representing the fake individual. Still, many Taiwanese avoided attending the filming of the performance out of superstition, and the priest ritually cleansed the film crew with incense.

=== Other work and exhibitions ===
She did a one-woman show at the Collective Unconscious in downtown Manhattan in 2007 and at the Abrons Art Center the next year. She was included in the show "Me Love You Long Time" that travelled from Newark's Aljira Center for Contemporary Art to Mills Gallery at the Boston Center for the Arts in 2013.

Yoon is also a master storyteller who has presented at the American Museum of Natural History, Newark Museum, and the Korea Society. Currently she teaches and lectures at the Metropolitan Museum of Art and the Morgan Library & Museum in New York City.

== Collections ==
Smith College, Scripps College, Otis College of Art and Design, Museum of Modern Art, Temple University, Wellesley College's Book Art Collection, Haverford College, University of Melbourne Library, and private collections.

== Personal life ==
Yoon lives and works in Tribeca in New York City.

== Awards and recognition ==
- Pollock-Krasner Foundation
- Abrons Art Center artists residency, 1999-2000
- Manhattan Community Arts Fund, LMCC
- Asian Women Giving Circle, 2008
- Franklin Furnace Fund 2008-09
- New York State Council on the Arts, 2009
- Director's Award, Atlanta Korean Film Festival, 2013
- Named by HuffPost one of "10 Documentaries About Artists in Love You Need to Watch," 2014

== Filmography and TV appearances ==
- Maria the Korean Bride: The Voice of Asian American Women, 2013
- Cake Boss, TLC, Season 4, Episode 28, "A Funny Regis and Fifty Weddings"
- KBS Documentary Age: The story of a woman who has 50 weddings (KBS 다큐시대 – 50번의 결혼식을 올린 여자의 이야기), 2011
