= Royal Consort Injeol Hyeon-Bi =

Goryeo consort (fl. 11th century)

Worthy Consort Injeol 인절현비
- Died: 25 August 1082; Goryeo
- Spouse: Munjong of Goryeo (before 1082)
- Issue: 2 unnamed daughters
Regnal name
- Princess Sunggyeong (숭경궁주; 崇敬宮主)
Posthumous name
- Injeol (인절; 仁節)
- House: Incheon Yi (by birth); House of Wang (by marriage)
- Father: Yi Ja-yeon
- Mother: Grand Lady Gim of Gyerim State

Royal Consort Injeol of the Incheon Yi clan (Korean: 인절현비 이씨; Hanja: 仁節賢妃 李氏; lit. 'Worthy Consort Injeol of the Incheon Yi clan'; d. 25 August 1082 (Note: In the Korean calendar (lunisolar), she died on 29th day of the 7th month of 1082.)) or during her lifetime was called as Princess Sunggyeong (숭경궁주; 崇敬宮主) was the 4th wife of King Munjong of Goryeo.

She was born into the Incheon Yi clan as the youngest child and daughter of Yi Ja-yeon (이자연) and Lady Gim (부인 김씨), daughter of Gim In-wi (김인위) from the Gyeongju Gim clan. Her two elder sisters both became Munjong of Goryeo's second and third wife. Although the date when she entered the palace is unknown, but she was honoured with the Royal title of Princess Sunggyeong (숭경궁주; 崇敬宮主). Meanwhile, she later died in 1082 (36th year reign of King Munjong) and received her posthumous name of Worthy Consort Injeol (인절현비; 仁節賢妃).
