= Princess Daeryeong =

Princess of Goryeo
- Coronation: 1102
- Successor: Princess Heungsu
- Monarch: Wang Ong, King Sukjong
- Born: before 1102; Goryeo
- Died: 1114; Goryeo
- Spouse: Wang Gi; half first cousin
Posthumous name
- Jeongmok (정목, 貞穆; "Chaste and Majestic")
- House: House of Wang (by birth and marriage)
- Father: Sukjong of Goryeo
- Mother: Queen Myeongui of the Jeongju Yu clan

Princess Daeryeong (Korean: 대령궁주; 대령공주; Hanja: 大寧宮主; 大寧公主; d. 1114) was a Goryeo Royal Princess as the first and eldest daughter of King Sukjong and Queen Myeongui who married her half uncle's son–Wang Gi the Count Hoean (회안백 왕기), and received "2,000 sik-eup" (식읍 2,000호) and "300 sik-sil" (식실 300호).

She firstly received her title and honor as a princess in 1102 (7th years reign of her father) and in 1105 (her eldest brother's ascension), she was given the "Suryeong Palace" (수령궁; 壽寧宮) which name was changed into "Daeryeong Palace" (대령궁; 大寧宮) as her own mansion. However, based on the records left, there were fire accidents at Daeryeong palace one after another in 1105 and 1106. Not until ten years later, the princess died in 1114 without any issue and then received her posthumous name, Jeongmok (정목; 貞穆).
