= Royal Consort Ingyeong Hyeon-Bi =

Goryeo royal consort (fl. 11th century)

Worthy Consort Ingyeong 인경현비
- Spouse: Munjong of Goryeo
- Issue: Wang Do; Wang Su; Wang Yu
Regnal name
- Princess Suryeong (수령궁주, 壽寧宮主)
Posthumous name
- Ingyeong (인경, 仁敬; "Benevolent and Respectful")
- House: Incheon Yi (by birth); House of Wang (by marriage)
- Father: Yi Ja-yeon
- Mother: Grand Lady Gim of Gyerim State

Royal Consort Ingyeong of the Incheon Yi clan (Korean: 인경현비 이씨; Hanja: 仁敬賢妃 李氏; lit. 'Worthy Consort Ingyeong of the Incheon Yi clan') or during her lifetime was called as Princess Suryeong (수령궁주; 壽寧宮主) was the third wife of King Munjong of Goryeo.

She was born into the Incheon Yi clan as the tenth child and second daughter of Yi Ja-yeon (이자연) and Lady Gim (부인 김씨), daughter of Gim In-wi (김인위) from the Gyeongju Gim clan. Her elder sister became Munjong of Goryeo's second wife and her younger sister became his fourth wife. Although the date when she entered the palace is unknown, but she was honoured with the Royal title of Princess Suryeong (수령궁주; 壽寧宮主) and became a Pure Consort (숙비; 淑妃) in 1082. She later received her posthumous name of Worthy Consort Ingyeong (인경현비; 仁敬賢妃) and they had 3 sons together. Through her eldest son, she would become the paternal great-grandmother of Queen Janggyeong, Marchioness Gaeryeong, Queen Uijeong, and Queen Seonjeong.
