= Sunjong of Goryeo =

King of Goryeo in 1083

Sunjong 순종 順宗

King of Goryeo
- Reign: 1083–1083
- Coronation: 1083; Gaegyeong, Goryeo
- Predecessor: Munjong of Goryeo
- Successor: Seonjong of Goryeo
- Born: 28 December 1047; Gaegyeong, Goryeo
- Died: 5 December 1083 (aged 35); Chisang-so, Gaegyeong, Goryeo
- Burial: Seongneung (성릉; 成陵)
- Consorts: Queen Jeongui Princess Yeonbok (before 1083) Princess Janggyeong (m. 1083–1083)
Names
- Wang Hyu (왕휴), later Wang Hun (왕훈)
Posthumous name
- Great King Yeongmyeong Jeongheon Seonhye 영명정헌선혜대왕 (英明靖憲宣惠大王)
Temple name
- Sunjong (순종; 順宗)
- House: Wang
- Dynasty: Goryeo
- Father: Munjong of Goryeo
- Mother: Queen Inye

- Korean name
- Hangul: 왕훈
- Hanja: 王勳
- RR: Wang Hun
- MR: Wang Hun

Monarch name
- Hangul: 순종
- Hanja: 順宗
- RR: Sunjong
- MR: Sunjong

Courtesy name
- Hangul: 의공
- Hanja: 義恭
- RR: Uigong
- MR: Ŭigong

Posthumous name
- Hangul: 선혜대왕
- Hanja: 宣惠大王
- RR: Seonhye daewang
- MR: Sŏnhye taewang

Former name
- Hangul: 왕휴
- Hanja: 王烋
- RR: Wang Hyu
- MR: Wang Hyu

Sunjong (28 December 1047 – 5 December 1083), born Wang Hyu, later renamed Wang Hun, was briefly the 12th king of the Goryeo dynasty of Korea. He was the eldest son of King Munjong and the older brother of King Seonjong. He had been confirmed as heir to the throne in 1054 and during his time as heir, his father actively cultivated his status both domestically and internationally, charging him with leading banquets amongst the Goryeo nobility and making him treat with envoys from the Song dynasty of China. However, he died within a year of his ascension in 1083; his four month long reign was the shortest in Goryeo's history.

== Family ==
- Father: Munjong of Goryeo
  - Grandfather: Hyeonjong of Goryeo
  - Grandmother: Queen Wonhye of the Ansan Kim clan
- Mother: Queen Inye of the Gyeongwon Yi clan
  - Grandfather: Yi Ja-yeon
  - Grandmother: Lady, of the Gyeongju Kim clan
- Consorts and their respective issue(s):
1. Queen Jeongui of the Kaesong Wang clan, first cousin – No issue.
2. Queen Seonhui of the Gyeongju Kim clan – No issue.
3. Princess Janggyeong of the Gyeongwon Yi clan – No issue.

== See also ==
- List of Korean monarchs
- List of Goryeo people
- Goryeo

Sunjong of Goryeo House of Wang Born: 28 December 1047 Died: 5 December 1083
Regnal titles
Preceded by Munjong	King of Goryeo; 1083	Succeeded by Seonjong
