= Sukjong of Goryeo =

King of Goryeo from 1095 to 1105

Sukjong 숙종 肅宗

King of Goryeo
- Reign: 1095–1105
- Coronation: 1095; Junggwang Hall, Gaegyeong, Goryeo
- Predecessor: Heonjong of Goryeo
- Successor: Yejong of Goryeo
- Born: Wang Hui; 2 September 1054; Yeonhwa Palace, Gaegyeong, Goryeo
- Died: 10 November 1105 (aged 51); Outside Jangpyeong Gate, Gaegyeong, Goryeo
- Burial: Yeongneung (영릉; 英陵)
- Queen Consort: Queen Myeongui (before 1079)
- Issue: Sons: Wang U Wang Pil Wang Jing-eom Wang Bo Wang Hyo Wang Seo Wang Gyo; Daughters: Princess Daeryeong Princess Heungsu Princess Ansu Princess Boknyeong
Posthumous name
- Great King Munhye Gangjeong Myeonghyo 문혜강정명효대왕 (文惠康正明孝大王)
Temple name
- Sukjong (숙종; 肅宗)
- House: Wang
- Dynasty: Goryeo
- Father: Munjong of Goryeo
- Mother: Queen Inye

- Korean name
- Hangul: 왕옹
- Hanja: 王顒
- RR: Wang Ong
- MR: Wang Ong

Monarch name
- Hangul: 숙종
- Hanja: 肅宗
- RR: Sukjong
- MR: Sukchong

Courtesy name
- Hangul: 천상
- Hanja: 天常
- RR: Cheonsang
- MR: Ch'ŏnsang

Posthumous name
- Hangul: 명효대왕
- Hanja: 明孝大王
- RR: Myeonghyo daewang
- MR: Myŏnghyo taewang

Former name
- Hangul: 왕희
- Hanja: 王熙
- RR: Wang Hui
- MR: Wang Hŭi

Sukjong (2 September 1054 – 10 November 1105), personal name Wang Ong, was the 15th king of the Goryeo dynasty of Korea.

Sukjong rose to the throne in 1095 upon the abdication of his young nephew, King Heonjong. He oversaw various internal innovations, including the distribution of the country's first brass coins (in 1102) and the construction of the new Southern Capital (Namgyeong, present-day Seoul).

However, he was also faced by threats from without, most notably an 1104 invasion by the northern Jurchen tribes. Unable to repel the Jurchens by force, he sent his general Yun Kwan to raise an army and repulse them. This army is known as Byeolmuban and consisted of three separate divisions. Sukjong died the following year, while on the way to the western capital, Pyongyang. Challenges of Sukjong's reign can be summarized in his own words:

Since I was entrusted with the affairs of the state, I have always endeavoured to cautiously maintain diplomatic ties with Liao in the north and serve the Song in the south, while these days the Jurchen in the east have become enemies to be reckoned with. Making the people comfortable is the first imperative of military and political affairs, so all unnecessary corvée duties must be abolished in order for the people to live comfortably!

== Family ==
- Father: Munjong of Goryeo
  - Grandfather: Hyeonjong of Goryeo
  - Grandmother: Queen Wonhye of the Ansan Kim clan
- Mother: Queen Inye of the Gyeongwon Yi clan
  - Grandfather: Yi Ja-yeon
  - Grandmother: Lady, of the Gyeongju Kim clan
- Consorts and their respective issue(s):
1. Queen Myeongui of the Chŏngju Yu clan
  1. Crown Prince Wang U, 1st son
  2. Wang Pil, Marquess Sangdang (상당후 왕필), 2nd son
  3. Wang Jing-eom (왕징엄), 3rd son – a monk.
  4. Wang Bo, Duke Daebang (대방공 왕보), 4th son
  5. Wang Hyo, Duke Daewon, 5th son
  6. Wang Seo, Duke Jean (제안공 왕서), 6th son,
  7. Wang Gyo, Marquess Tongui (통의후 왕교), 7th son,
  8. Princess Daeryeong, 1st daughter
  9. Princess Heungsu, 2nd daughter
  10. Princess Ansu, 3rd daughter
  11. Princess Boknyeong (1096–1133), 4th daughter
2. Unknown
  1. Wang Hyeon-eung (왕현응), 8th son – a monk.

== See also ==
- List of monarchs of Korea
- Goryeo
- Sukjong of Joseon

Sukjong of Goryeo House of Wang Born: 2 September 1054 Died: 10 November 1105
Regnal titles
Preceded by Heonjong	King of Goryeo; 1095–1105	Succeeded by Yejong
Korean royalty
New creation	Marquis of Gyerim; 1065–1077	Succeeded by Himself as Duke of Gyerim
Preceded by Himself as Marquis of Gyerim	Duke of Gyerim; 1077–1095	Merged in the Crown
