= Munjong of Goryeo =

King of Goryeo from 1046 to 1083

Munjong 문종 文宗

King of Goryeo
- Reign: 1046–1083
- Coronation: 1046; Junggwang Hall, Gaegyeong, Goryeo
- Predecessor: Jeongjong of Goryeo
- Successor: Sunjong of Goryeo
- Born: Wang Hwi; 29 December 1019; Anbok Palace, Gaegyeong, Goryeo
- Died: 2 September 1083 (aged 63); Junggwang Hall, Gaegyeong, Goryeo
- Burial: Gyeongneung (경릉; 景陵)
- Queen Consort: Queen Inpyeong Queen Inye (before 1047)
- Consort: Princess Suryeong Princess Sunggyeong (before 1082) Princess Sunghwa (m. 1049–1083)
- Issue: Sons: Wang Hun Wang Un Wang Ong Wang Hu Wang Su Wang T'aeng Wang Pi Wang Ŭm Wang Ch'im Wang Kyŏng Wang To Wang Su Wang Yu; Daughters: Princess Jeokgyeong Princess Boryeong
Posthumous name
- Great King Gangjeong Myeongdae Jangseong Inhyo 강정명대장성인효대왕 (剛定明大章聖仁孝大王)
Temple name
- Munjong (문종; 文宗)
- House: Wang
- Dynasty: Goryeo
- Father: Hyeonjong of Goryeo
- Mother: Queen Wonhye

- Korean name
- Hangul: 왕휘
- Hanja: 王徽
- RR: Wang Hwi
- MR: Wang Hwi

Monarch name
- Hangul: 문종
- Hanja: 文宗
- RR: Munjong
- MR: Munjong

Courtesy name
- Hangul: 촉유
- Hanja: 燭幽
- RR: Chokyu
- MR: Ch'ogyu

Posthumous name
- Hangul: 인효대왕
- Hanja: 仁孝大王
- RR: Inhyo daewang
- MR: Inhyo taewang

Munjong (29 December 1019 – 2 September 1083), personal name Wang Hwi, was the 11th monarch of the Goryeo dynasty of Korea.

King Munjong was born in 1019 and reigned from 1046 until his death in 1083. During his reign, the central government of Goryeo gained complete authority and power over local lords. Munjong, and later kings, emphasized the importance of civilian leadership over the military. Munjong expanded Korea's borders northward to the Yalu and Tumen Rivers and built many forts to guard the northern border.

Munjong's fourth son, Uicheon (born 1055), became a Buddhist priest who founded the Cheontae as an independent school of Buddhism. During Munjong's reign, academic physician officers (hallimuigwan) first appeared in Goryeo, and Goryeo's medicinal exams were often used as a pathway by the commoners for societal advancement. Additionally, during Munjong's reign many Chinese medicine books entered Goryeo through the Song Dynasty of China.

== Family ==
- Father: Hyeonjong of Goryeo
  - Grandfather: Anjong of Goryeo
  - Grandmother: Queen Heonjeong of the Hwangju Hwangbo clan
- Mother: Queen Wonhye of the Ansan Kim clan
  - Grandfather: Kim Ŭnbu
  - Grandmother: Grand Lady of Ansan County of the Gyeongwon Yi clan (안산군대부인 이씨)
- Consorts and their Respective issue(s):
1. Queen Inpyeong of the Ansan Kim clan, half younger sister – No issue.
2. Queen Inye of the Gyeongwon Yi clan
  1. Crown Prince Wang Hun, 1st son
  2. Wang Un, Marquis Gukwon, 2nd son
  3. Wang Ong, Duke Gyerim, 3rd son
  4. Wang Hu, 4th son – a monk.
  5. Wang Su, Duke Sangan (상안공 왕수), 5th son
  6. Wang T'aeng, 6th son – a monk.
  7. Wang Pi, Marquess Geumgwan (금관후 왕비), 7th son
  8. Wang Ŭm, Marquess Byeonhan (변한후 왕음), 8th son
  9. Wang Ch'im, Marquess Nakrang (낙랑후 왕침), 9th son
  10. Wang Kyŏng (왕경), 10th son – a monk.
  11. Princess Jeokgyeong, 1st daughter
  12. Princess Boryeong, 2nd daughter
  13. 3rd daughter
  14. 4th daughter
3. Worthy Consort Ingyeong of the Gyeongwon Yi clan
  1. Wang To, Duke Joseon, 11th son
  2. Wang Su, Duke Buyeo, 12th son
  3. Wang Yu, Duke Jinhan, 13th son
4. Worthy Consort Injeol of the Gyeongwon Yi clan
  1. 5th daughter
  2. 6th daughter
5. Virtuous Consort Inmok of the Gyeongju Kim clan
  1. 7th daughter

Munjong of Goryeo House of Wang Born: 29 December 1019 Died: 2 September 1083
Regnal titles
Preceded by Jeongjong	King of Goryeo; 1046–1083	Succeeded by Sunjong
