= Queen Janggyeong (Goryeo) =

Crown Princess of Goryeo (fl. 12th century)

Queen Janggyeong 장경왕후

Crown Princess of Goryeo
- Tenure: 1143–1146
- Coronation: 1143
- Successor: Crown Princess Wang

Queen consort of Goryeo
- Tenure: 1146–c. 1170
- Coronation: 1146
- Predecessor: Queen Gongye
- Successor: Queen Jangseon
- Born: 1129; Goryeo
- Died: Unknown
- Burial: Huireung tomb
- Spouse: Uijong of Goryeo (m. 1143)
- Issue: Crown Prince Hyoryeong; Princess Gyeongdeok; Princess Anjeong; Princess Hwasun
Regnal name
- Princess Heungdeok (흥덕궁주, 興德宮主; from 1151)
Posthumous name
- Queen Hyeja Janggyeong 혜자장경왕후 (惠資莊敬王后)
- House: Gangneung Kim clan (official); Wang (agnatic and by marriage)
- Father: Wang On, Duke Gangneung
- Mother: Lady Kim of the Gangneung Kim clan

Queen Janggyeong (Korean: 장경왕후 김씨; Hanja: 莊敬王后 金氏; 1129 – ?) of the Gangneung Kim clan, or also posthumously known as Queen Gyeongsun (경순왕후; 景順王后), was a Goryeo royal family member. Because members of the same clan couldn't get married, she became the 12th reigned Goryeo queen who followed her maternal clan after Queen Gyeonghwa, and the eldest among Marchioness Daeryeong, Queen Uijeong, and Queen Seonjeong.

== Biography ==
=== Early life and marriage ===
Lady Wang was born as the second child and eldest daughter of Duke Gangneung and Lady Kim of the Gangneung Kim clan. Through her father, she was a great-granddaughter of King Munjong. She became a queen consort through her marriage with her second half-cousin once removed, King Uijong as his primary wife. Her younger sisters eventually became Queen Consorts of future Goryeo Kings through their marriages.

=== Life as queen consort and palace life ===
Although she changed her clan after marriage and became Queen Consort, she was sometimes still recognized by her biological paternal lineage. She married Uijong when he became Crown Prince and thought that she was in a very influential position within the royal family. Meanwhile, after her husband ascended the throne, she then given the Royal title of Princess Heungdeok (흥덕궁주; 興德宮主) in 1151 and two years later, she gave birth to their first son, Crown Prince Hyoryeong, in 1149 whom later formally became Crown Prince in 1153. Besides him, she also bore Uijong their three daughters.

It was said that before Hyoryeong was born, both Kim and Uijong vowed to make "4 Copies of Hwaeom Sutra" (화엄경 4부) using Gold and Silver characters if they had a son. Then, after the prince was born, the second copies was copied and stored in Heungwang Temple, Honggyo-won. At this time, an inauguration ceremony was held. Later in 1170, when Chŏng Chung-bu deposed and later killed Uijong, the Queen got exiled to Jindo-hyeon and was believed to be assassinated and died there.

=== Death and posthumous name ===
It was unknown when the Queen died since there were no records about this, but after her death, she then buried in Huireung Tomb (희릉; 禧陵) along with her husband, King Uijong.

- In October 1253 (40th year reign of King Gojong), named Hye-ja (혜자; 惠資) was added to her posthumous name.

== Family ==
- Father - Wang On, Duke Gangneung (강릉공 왕온; 1090–1146)
- Mother - Lady Kim of the Gangneung Kim clan (강릉 김씨; 1090 – ?)
- Siblings
  - Older brother - Wang Yŏng, Marquess Gonghwa (공화후 왕영; 1126–1186)
  - Younger brother - Wang Chak (왕작; 王鷟; 1129 – ?)
  - Younger sister - Queen Uijeong of the Gangneung Kim clan (1132–c.1170)
    - Brother-in-law - Wang Ho, Myeongjong of Goryeo (8 November 1131 – 3 December 1202)
      - Nephew - Wang O, Gangjong of Goryeo (10 May 1152 – 26 August 1213)
      - Niece - Princess Yeonhui (1154 – ?)
      - Niece - Princess Suan (1161 – 23 June 1199)
  - Younger sister - Lady Wang of the Kaeseong Wang clan (개성 왕씨; 1135 – ?)
  - Younger sister - Queen Seonjeong of the Gangneung Kim clan (1137–1222)
    - Brother-in-law - Wang T'ak, Sinjong of Goryeo (11 November 1144 – 15 February 1204)
      - Nephew - Wang Sŏ, Duke Yangyang (1170 – ?)
      - Nephew - Wang Yŏng, Huijong of Goryeo (22 June 1182 – 31 August 1237)
      - Niece - Princess Hyohoe (1183–1199)
      - Niece - Princess Gyeongnyeong (1185 – ?)
- Husband - Wang Hyŏn, Uijong of Goryeo (23 May 1127 – 7 July 1173)
- Issue
  - Daughter - Princess Gyeongdeok (1147 – ?)
  - Daughter - Princess Anjeong (1148 – ?)
  - Son - Crown Prince Hyoryeong (4 June 1149 – ?)
  - Daughter - Princess Hwasun (1150 – ?)

== In popular culture ==
- Portrayed by Choi Jung-won in the 2003–2004 KBS TV series Age of Warriors.
