= Wang Ch'ung-hŭi =

Korean prince (fl. 12th century)

- Born: around 1131–1144; Goryeo
- Died: 1182/3 (Note: According to the "Goryeosa Hubijeon", he died in 1182 (12th years reign of Myeongjong); but according to the "Goryeosa Jongsiljeon", he died in 1183 (13th years reign of Myeongjong).); Goryeo
Posthumous name
- Wongyeong 원경국사, 元敬國師 ('National Preceptor Primary Respectful')
- House: Wang
- Father: Injong of Goryeo
- Mother: Queen Gongye of the Jangheung Im clan
- Religion: Buddhism

Wang Ch'ung-hŭi (Korean: 왕충희; Hanja: 王冲曦; d. 1182/3) or Wang Hyŏn-hŭi (왕현희; 王玄曦) was a Goryeo Royal Prince as the fourth son of King Injong and Queen Gongye. He was also a Buddhist monk under the name National Preceptor Wongyeong and seungtong Jeungse.

== Biography ==
=== Early life and relatives ===
Although the exact date when Ch'ung-hŭi was born is unknown, seeing that his brothers were born in 1131 (Wang Ho) and 1144 (Wang T'ak), Ch'ung-hŭi was born after 1131 but before 1144 as the fourth son of King Injong of Goryeo and Queen Gongye from the Jangheung Im clan. He had four brothers (Uijong, Daeryeong, Myeongjong, Sinjong) and four sisters (Seunggyeong, Deoknyeong, Changrak, Yeonghwa).

=== During Uijong's reign ===
In 1148 (Uijong's 2nd year reign), Ch'ung-hŭi went to Heungwang Temple (흥왕사) as a monk and received the name Jeungse (증세; 拯世) from his eldest brother, who was the king. In there, Ch'ung-hŭi befriended and often played together with his great-grandfather's grandson, Wang Chang (왕장). However, there was a rumor spread that the two of them were planning a treason in 1155 and Uijong then revoked Wang Chang's title, but did not punish Ch'ung-hŭi as Ch'ung-hŭi was his full brother.

In 1157, Ch'ung-hŭi was one of the 200 monks who joined Uijong in performed the "Gibokjae" (기복재; 祈福齋) at Mokchin Hall (목친전). Then, in 1167, a banquet was held at Cheongnyeongjae (청녕재; 淸寧齋), many people (including Ch'ung-hŭi) were invited and enjoyed this, even monk Gakye (각예)–Yejong's eldest illegitimate son and some servants attended this banquet and drank, floated a boat in Jungmijeong Pond (중미정; 衆美亭) and played till night.

=== During Myeongjong's reign ===
In 1177 (Myeongjong's 7th year reign), a monk from Heungwangsa Temple reported that: "Monk Ch'ung-hŭi was secretly plotting to rebel with several monks there" (승통 충희가 여러 승려들과 몰래 음모를 꾀하고 있다). Following this, Ch'ung-hŭi's servants were interrogated, but all charges were not found and they were all released then.

Meanwhile, in 1180, Ch'ung-hŭi's mother, the queen dowager became seriously ill and his older brother–the king summoned him to take care of their mother. In the palace, Ch'ung-hŭi had a promiscuous relationship (even affair) with the court ladies and even with the princess. As the bad rumors about Ch'ung-hŭi spread to the outside of the palace, officer Ch'oe Sŏn (최선) reported Ch'ung-hŭi's promiscuous behavior to the king and suggested that Ch'ung-hŭi sent out of the palace.

However, Myeongjong who heard this, greatly surprised and said: "Woah, unexpectedly you (referring to Ch'oe) are trying to separate our brotherhood relationship" (뜻밖에 사간이 우리 형제를 이간질 하는구나) while dismissed Ch'oe not long after this from his position. Seeing this issue, the officers did not dare to do anything or even impeach Ch'ung-hŭi and the court ministers were all attached to Ch'ung-hŭi and offered bribes for him.

=== Death and later life ===
In 1182/3, Ch'ung-hŭi died and received the name Wongyeong (원경; 元敬) as his honorary posthumous name. Upon knowing this, Myeongjong deliberately didn't disclose this fact since he feared that their mother would be grieved and her ill would get worse if she couldn't withstand this. After several months, she slowly learned that her beloved son died and thought that many jealous generals had killed Ch'ung-hŭi. She also became very angry and eventually fell ill before she died not long after that.

=== Legacy ===
To commemorate Ch'ung-hŭi, a monument (충희선사탑비) was erected at Heunggyo Temple (흥교사), but didn't maintained in the nowadays and no records left about that.
