= Count Gonghwa =

Goryeo nobleman (1126–1186)

Marquess Gonghwa
- Born: Wang Yeong; 1126; Goryeo
- Died: 1186 (aged 59–60); Goryeo
- Spouse: Princess Seunggyeong
- Issue: Lady Wang; Wang Myeon
Regnal name
- Count Gonghwa (공화백; 恭化伯); Marquess Gonghwa (공화후; 恭化侯; given in c.1170)
Posthumous name
- Jeongui (정의, 定懿; "Stable and Benign")
- House: House of Wang
- Father: Wang On, Duke Gangneung
- Mother: Lady Gim
- Religion: Buddhism

Korean name
- Hangul: 왕영
- Hanja: 王瑛
- RR: Wang Yeong
- MR: Wang Yŏng

Royal title
- Hangul: 공화백, 공화후
- Hanja: 恭化伯, 恭化侯
- RR: Gonghwabaek, Gonghwahu
- MR: Konghwabaek, Konghwahu

Courtesy name
- Hangul: 현허
- Hanja: 玄虛
- RR: Hyeonheo
- MR: Hyŏnhŏ

Posthumous name
- Hangul: 정의
- Hanja: 定懿
- RR: Jeongui
- MR: Chŏngŭi

Count Gonghwa or Marquess Gonghwa (1126–1186 (Note: In the Korean calendar (lunisolar), he died on 10th day 10th month 1186.)), personal name Wang Yeong (왕영; 王瑛) was a Goryeo royal family member as the great-grandson of King Munjong who became the maternal uncle of Huijong and Gangjong.

== Biography ==
=== Biography ===
Although there is not much information left about his life, but it was believed that he had a calm and quiet personality, not greedy and show great enthusiasm for his studies. During the early years of King Uijong, he became a Jeonjungnaegeupsa (전중내급사; 殿中內給事) and although the King assumed this, he did not allow it since there was no precedent for a son from the royal family who had been given the title of "Marquess" (후; 侯) and humbled himself with became a public servant (공사; 貢士) from the past.

He then became Count Gonghwa (공화백; 恭化伯) on the day he married at his 30s and the King bestowed great favors upon him. After his brother-in-law, Marquess Ikyang ascended the throne in 1170, Wang Yeong was promoted into Marquess Gonghwa (공화후; 恭化侯) and a devout believer in Buddhism on his later years before later died in 1186 at age 61 years old.

=== Relatives and marriage ===
Wang Yeong had 4 sisters: Queen Janggyeong, Marchioness Daeryeong, Queen Uijeong (mother of King Gangjong), Queen Seonjeong (mother of King Huijong) and a younger brother named Wang Jak (왕작; 王鷟).

According to Goryeosa, Wang Yeong married his half second cousin once removed, Princess Seunggyeong (승경궁주; eldest daughter of King Injong) and together, they had two children: a daughter and a son. Through his only son, he would become both brother and in-law to Queen Janggyeong.

- Lady Wang (왕씨, 王氏; 1150–1185), 1st daughter. She was unmarried until her death at 36 years old due to her illness in Changsin Temple (창신사, 彰信寺; Southern Gaeseong).
- Wang Myeon, Duke Gwangneung (광릉공 면, 廣陵公 沔; d. 1218), 1st son. Married his first cousin (his aunt's daughter), Princess Hwasun (화순궁주; 和順宮主).
