= Crown Prince Hyoryeong =

Crown Prince of Goryeo (fl. 12th century)

Wang Ki

Crown Prince of Goryeo
- Reign: 1153–1170
- Coronation: 1153
- Predecessor: Crown Prince Wang Ch'ŏl
- Successor: Crown Prince Wang Suk
- Monarch: King Uijong (father)
- Born: Wang Ki; 4 June 1149; Gaegyeong, Goryeo
- Died: fl. 1170; Goryeo
- Spouse: Lady Wang (m. 1168–1170)
- Son: 1
Posthumous name
- Crown Prince Hyoryeong (효령태자; 孝靈太子)
- House: Wang
- Father: Uijong of Goryeo
- Mother: Queen Janggyeong

Korean name
- Hangul: 왕기
- Hanja: 王祈
- RR: Wang Gi
- MR: Wang Ki

Royal title
- Hangul: 효령태자
- Hanja: 孝靈太子
- RR: Hyoryeong taeja
- MR: Hyoryŏng t'aeja

Childhood name
- Hangul: 왕홍
- Hanja: 王泓
- RR: Wang Hong
- MR: Wang Hong

Crown Prince Hyoryeong (Korean: 효령태자; Hanja: 孝靈太子; born 4 June 1149 (Note: In the Korean calendar (lunisolar), he was born on 27th day of the fourth lunar month.)), personal name Wang Ki was a Goryeo Royal Prince as the first and oldest son of King Uijong and Queen Janggyeong who was later deposed from his position alongside his father by Chŏng Chung-bu and Yi Ŭi-bang in 1170.

== Biography ==
=== Early life and background ===
Born on 4 June 1149 with the childhood name of Wang Hong (왕홍; 王泓) and personal name of Wang Ki (왕기; 王祈), he was the only son of King Uijong and Queen Janggyeong.

Through his father, both of King Myeongjong and Sinjong were his uncle and both of their sons (Gangjong and Huijong) were Ki's first cousins. Meanwhile, since Queen Uijeong (Myeongjong's wife) and Queen Seonjeong (Sinjong's wife) were his mother's younger sisters, so they became both his paternal aunt-in-law and maternal aunt, same with Myeongjong and Sinjong who would become both his paternal uncle and maternal uncle-in-law.

=== Palace life and marriage ===
On May 15, 1153, (Note: In the Korean calendar (lunisolar), the 20th day of the 4th Lunar month during the 7th year of Uijong's reign.) the four-year-old Wang Ki formally became the crown prince. Then, Im Kŭk-ch'ung (임극충; brother of Queen Gongye) was chosen as the prince's teacher in 1155 and a year later, Kim Chon-jung (김존중) was appointed as the junior guardian of the heir apparent (태자소보; 太子少保; t'aejasobo) alongside Yi Chi-mu (이지무) who was also appointed as the grand guardian of the heir apparent (태자태보; 太子太保; t'aejat'aebo).

In 1162, Ki performed a gwannye (관례; 冠禮) and in 1168, he received the daughter of Duke Gangyang (강양공) and Princess Deoknyeong (덕녕궁주) as his Princess consort. Together, they had a son.

Princess Deoknyeong (his mother-in-law) was the second daughter of his grandfather, King Injong, so she was initially his aunt. Meanwhile, Duke Gangyang (his father-in-law) was the only son of Duke Daewon, the fifth son of King Sukjong who was Injong's grandfather. Through Duke Gangyang, Ki was the paternal second cousin once removed to his wife, but through Princess Deoknyeong, Ki was the maternal first cousin to her.

=== Deposition and removal ===
However, in 1170 (24th year reign of King Uijong), Chŏng Chung-bu who was dissatisfied with the King whom usually politically centered on eunuchs, then killed about 10 eunuchs in the palace. After moved the King to "Gungigam" (군기감; 軍器監), they led a coup to dethroned him and his successors.

At this time, Wang Ki was imprisoned at "Yeongeun Hall" (영은관; 迎恩館) and in the next day, Uijong was exiled to "Geoje-hyeon" (거제현; modern-day Geoje, South Korea.), Ki was expelled to "Jindo-hyeon" (진도현; modern-day Jindo County, South Jeolla Province, South Korea.), while his son was murdered. In 1173, Uijong was assassinated by Yi Ŭi-min at Gyerim (계림; 鷄林) and whether the prince was still alive or dead is unknown as there are no records left. After this, the throne was succeeded by Uijong's second younger brother, Wang Ho, the Duke Ikyang who became known as "King Myeongjong".

== Notes ==
Crown Prince Hyoryeong House of Wang
Regnal titles
Preceded by Crown Prince Wang Cheol	Crown Prince of Goryeo; 1153–1170	Succeeded by Crown Prince Wang Suk
