= Queen Wondeok =

Goryeo queen (fl. 12th–13th centuries)

Queen Wondeok 원덕왕후

Crown Princess of Goryeo
- Tenure: 1175–1197
- Coronation: 1175
- Predecessor: Deposed Crown Princess Yi
- Successor: Deposed Crown Princess Wang

Queen consort of Goryeo
- Tenure: 1212–1213
- Coronation: 1212
- Predecessor: Queen Seongpyeong
- Successor: Queen Anhye

Queen dowager of Goryeo
- Tenure: 1213–1239
- Coronation: 1213
- Predecessor: Queen Dowager Jeongseon
- Successor: Queen Dowager Myeongdeok
- Monarch: King Gojong (son)
- Born: 1161; Goryeo
- Died: 1239 (aged about 77–78); Goryeo
- Burial: Golleung tomb San 75, Giljeong-ri, Yangdo-myeon, Ganghwa County, Incheon
- Spouse: Gangjong of Goryeo (m. 1175; died 1213)
- Issue: Gojong of Goryeo
Regnal name
- Princess Yeondeok (연덕궁주; 延德宮主; given in 1212); Queen Mother Wondeok (원덕태후; 元德太后); Grand Queen Mother Wondeok (원덕왕태후; 元德王太后)
Posthumous name
- Queen Mother Jeonggang Wondeok 정강원덕태후 (貞康元德太后)
- House: Yu (official); Wang (agnatic and by marriage)
- Father: Wang Sŏng, Marquess Sinan
- Mother: Princess Changrak

Queen Wondeok of the Yu clan (Korean: 원덕왕후 유씨; Hanja: 元德王后 柳氏; 1161–1239) was a Goryeo royal family member as the descendant of King Munjong. She became queen consort through her marriage to her cousin once removed, King Gangjong, becoming his second wife She then changed her initial clan and became the mother of his only successor, King Gojong. Gangjong was her close relative in the maternal line, but very distant in the paternal line.

At one time, she was the second-in-command in the inner list of the main palace, but was dethroned and came back as a queen consort and queen dowager (first-in-command). Due to the war, her husband was exiled and they hid in Ganghwa Island. She is recognised for her dynamic life.

== Biography ==
Her father-in-law, King Myeongjong was her mother's brother. So, both she and her husband were first cousins and related by blood to King Sukjong and Queen Myeongui.

=== Marriage ===
She married Crown Prince Wang O in 1175, a year after his first wife's removal, becoming his second wife. In 1192, after 17 years of marriage, they had a son, Wang Jin (the future Gojong, King Anhyo the Great).

However, in 1197, her father-in-law, King Myeongjong was deposed and imprisoned in Changrak Palace by Ch'oe Ch'ung-hŏn and Choe Chung-su. As a result, her husband, as prince, was also dethroned, and she accompanied him in exile to Ganghwa Island. Myeongjong's throne went to his youngest brother, the 53-year-old Wang T'ak. After Wang-Tak's death, the throne was passed to his son, Wang Yŏng.

=== Life as Queen consort ===
In 1212, 14 years after their initial exile, her 60-year-old husband ascended the throne, after Huijong was defeated by the two Choe brothers. She formally became Queen Consort and was given the royal title of Princess Yeondeok (연덕궁주; 延德宮主), and once again resided in the palace of Manwoldae.

It seems that she raised Princess Suryeong, the daughter from her husband's marriage to his first wife. When Princess Suryeong married, she dedicated a tribute to Yeondeok, thanking her for her care.

The Queen was said to have virtue and beauty. One year later, her husband fell ill and died.

=== Life as Queen mother ===
Her husband was succeeded by their only son, to which she later became a queen dowager (태후; 太后). Although the date she formally became a queen dowager was unknown, but in 1215, both she and King Gojong stayed in Western Cheongju Palace (청주동궁; 淸州洞宮) for a while. From this time, she was called as Grand Queen Mother (왕태후; 王太后), but in 1216, her mother died. In order to mourn his maternal grandmother, Gojong was said to wore a So-bok (소복) for three days after her death.

In 1218, her son married a relative and one year later, their eldest son and child, Wang Jeon was born. In 1220, her brother, Marquess Yeongin died. In 1232, she left Sangdo (상도; 上都) and moved to Gangdo (강도; 江都) while her daughter-in-law died that same year. Three years later, Wang Jeon married and in 1236, his eldest son, Wang Sim was born.

=== Later life and death ===
Meanwhile, the queen mother later died around the age of 77 or 78 years old in 1239 after lonely life for more than 20 years, which she became one of the few longest-living Goryeo queens. She then buried in Golleung Tomb (곤릉; 坤陵) which nowadays became the "Historic Site No. 371". Also received her posthumous name of Jeonggang (정강; 靖康) under Gojong's command in 1253.

== Ancestors ==
Ancestors of Queen Wondeok

Wang Yŏng, Duke Nakrang 왕영 낙랑공
Wang Chŏng, Count Seunghwa 왕정 승화백
Princess Boryeong 보령궁주
Wang Ki, Count Hannam 왕기 한남백
King Myeonghyo the Great 명효대왕
Princess Heungsu 흥수공주
Queen Myeongui 명의왕후
Wang Sŏng, Marquess Sinan 왕성 신안후
King Myeonghyo the Great 명효대왕
King Munhyo the Great 문효대왕
Queen Myeongui 명의왕후
Princess Seungdeok 승덕궁주
Yi Cha-gyŏm 이자겸
Queen Sundeok 순덕왕후
Grand Lady of Byeonhan State 변한국대부인
Queen Wondeok 원덕왕후
King Myeonghyo the Great 명효대왕
King Munhyo the Great 문효대왕
Queen Myeongui 명의왕후
King Gonghyo the Great 공효대왕
Yi Cha-gyŏm 이자겸
Queen Sundeok 순덕왕후
Grand Lady of Byeonhan State 변한국대부인
Princess Changrak 창락궁주
Im Ŭi 임의
Im Won-hu 임원후
Lady of Nakrang County 낙랑군부인
Queen Gongye 공예왕후
Yi Wi 이위
Grand Lady of Jinhan State 진한국대부인

== In popular culture ==
- Portrayed by Jo Yang-ja in the 2003–2004 KBS TV series Age of Warriors.
