= Queen Jangseon =

Queen consort of Goryeo (fl. 12th century)

Queen Jangseon 장선왕후

Queen consort of Goryeo
- Tenure: 6 August 1148–?
- Coronation: 6 August 1148
- Predecessor: Queen Janggyeong
- Successor: Queen Seonjeong
- Born: 1132; Goryeo
- Died: Unknown
- Spouse: Uijong of Goryeo (m. 1148)
Posthumous name
- Jangseon (장선, 莊宣; "Solemn and Proclaiming")
- House: Jiksan Choe (by birth); House of Wang (by marriage)
- Father: Choe Dan
- Mother: Lady Im of the Jangheung Im clan

Queen Jangseon of the Jiksan Choe clan (Korean: 장선왕후 최씨; Hanja: 莊宣王后 崔氏; 1132–?) was a Goryeo queen consort and the second wife of King Uijong, her maternal first cousin. Her life wasn't described in too much detail as there's only a record of her becoming Uijong's queen consort on 6 August 1148, following her father's death that same year.

== Family ==
- Father - Choe Dan (최단; 崔端; 1110–1148)
- Mother - Lady Im of the Jangheung Im clan (장흥 임씨; 1110–?)
  - Aunt - Queen Gongye of the Jangheung Im clan (공예왕후 임씨; 2 October 1109 – 2 December 1183)
    - Uncle - Wang Hae, Injong of Goryeo (고려 인종; 29 October 1109 – 10 April 1146)
      - Cousin - Princess Seunggyeong (승경궁주; 1124–1158)
      - Cousin - Princess Deoknyeong (덕녕궁주; 1125–1192)
      - Cousin - Wang Hyeon, Uijong of Goryeo (고려 의종; 23 May 1127 – 7 July 1173)
        - Cousin-in-law - Queen Janggyeong of the Gangneung Kim clan (장경왕후 김씨)
      - Cousin - Wang Gyeong, Marquess Daeryeong (대령후; 1130–1167)
      - Cousin - Princess Changrak (창락궁주; 1130–1216)
      - Cousin - Wang Ho, Myeongjong of Goryeo (고려 명종; 8 November 1131 – 3 December 1202)
        - Cousin-in-law - Queen Uijeong of the Gangneung Kim clan (의정왕후 김씨; ? – 1170?)
      - Cousin - Princess Yeonghwa (영화궁주; 1141–1208)
      - Cousin - Wang Tak, Sinjong of Goryeo (고려 신종; 11 November 1144 – 15 February 1204)
        - Cousin-in-law - Queen Seonjeong of the Gangneung Kim clan (선정왕후 김씨; ? – 1222)
      - Cousin - Princess Wang (부부인 왕씨; 1146–?)
      - Cousin - Wang Chung-hui (왕충희) or Wongyeongguksa (원경국사; 1148–1183)
- Husband - Wang Hyeon, Uijong of Goryeo (고려 의종; 23 May 1127 – 7 July 1173) — No issue.
