= Duke Gwangneung =

Goryeo nobleman (died 1218)

- Born: Wang Myeon; Goryeo
- Died: 1218; Goryeo
- Spouse: Princess Hwasun
Regnal name
- Marquess Gwangneung (광릉후, 廣陵侯; given by King Sinjong); Duke Gwangneung (광릉공, 廣陵公)
- House: House of Wang
- Father: Wang Yeong, Marquess Gonghwa
- Mother: Princess Seunggyeong

Korean name
- Hangul: 왕면
- Hanja: 王沔
- RR: Wang Myeon
- MR: Wang Myŏn

Royal title
- Hangul: 광릉공, 광릉후
- Hanja: 廣陵公, 廣陵侯
- RR: Gwangneunggong, Gwangneunghu
- MR: Kwangnŭnggong, Kwangnŭnghu

Duke Gwangneung (Korean: 광릉공; Hanja: 廣陵公; died 1218 (Note: In the Korean calendar (lunisolar), he died on 14th day of the 5th month of 1218.)), also known as Marquess Gwangneung and personal name Wang Myeon (왕면; 王沔), was a Goryeo royal family member as the great-great-grandson of King Munjong and the maternal first cousin of Huijong and Gangjong.

He had an older sister who died in 1185 unmarried and later married his half third cousin once removed, Princess Hwasun (화순궁주) who was initially Queen Janggyeong's daughter, which from this marriage, Janggyeong became both of aunt and mother-in-law to him. Then, his uncle gave Myeon a Royal title of Marquess Gwangneung (광릉후; 廣陵侯) and later changed into Duke Gwangneung.

Although no detailed records about him, but he was said to have a simple and calm temperament, wrote well in calligraphy and sentences, also possessed many skills. In particular, he was well versed in medicine (의술; 醫術), stockpiling medicines (약; 藥) in his manor to heal people, and those who suffered from boils (종기; 腫氣) visited him which he earned and admired by everyone since he showed no reluctance on his face. However, he then died in 1218 (5th years reign of King Gojong).
