= Princess Suryeong =

Princess of Goryeo (fl. 12th–13th centuries)

- Born: 1178; Goryeo
- Died: Unknown
- Spouse: Wang Chun (m. 1212); sixth cousin
Posthumous name
- Gyeongryeol (경렬, 敬烈; "Respectful and Bright")
- House: Wang
- Father: Crown Prince Wang Suk
- Mother: Crown Princess Yi, of the Jeonju Yi clan
- Religion: Buddhism

Korean name
- Hangul: 수령궁주
- Hanja: 壽寧宮主
- RR: Suryeong gungju
- MR: Suryŏng kungju

Posthumous name
- Hangul: 경렬
- Hanja: 敬烈
- RR: Gyeongryeol
- MR: Kyŏngnyŏl

Princess Suryeong (1178–?) was a Goryeo Royal Princess as the first and eldest daughter of King Gangjong when he was still a crown prince, from his first former wife, Queen Sapyeong, who was the daughter of Yi Ŭi-bang. She was the older half-sister of King Gojong.

== Biography ==
=== Early life ===
She was born as the eldest daughter of Crown Prince Wang Suk and Crown Princess Yi during her grandfather, King Myeongjong's reign. However, after her maternal grandfather was assassinated in the coup led by Chŏng Kyun (정균), son of Chŏng Chung-bu, her mother was unable to gain the position of queen consort and got expelled from the palace as a result.

Despite events that led to her mother’s deposition and her unknown whereabouts, family records state that Lady Wang was born in 1178.

=== Marriage and later life ===
In 1212, she received her royal title and married her sixth cousin, Wang Ch'un, Duke Hawon (왕춘 하원공; 1181–?) as they were descended from King Hyeonjong. Ch'un's wife was initially Princess Hyohoe (효회공주), King Sinjong's eldest daughter, but since Hyohoe died at 17 years old in 1199, he remarried again with Suryeong. The couple had a son, Wang Jeon (왕전; 王佺), in 1210 who later married Princess Gasun; the fourth daughter of Queen Seongpyeong and King Huijong. Their daughter, Princess Gyeongchang, eventually married King Wonjong in 1244.

Although her death date is unknown, it was recorded that she was given a posthumous name of Gyeongryeol (경렬; 敬烈).
