= Manjeok =

Korean rebel (?–1198)

- Hangul: 만적
- Hanja: 萬積
- RR: Manjeok
- MR: Manjŏk

Manjeok or Manjŏk (Korean: 만적; Hanja: 萬積; ?–1198) was a slave of Ch'oe Ch'ung-hŏn, a powerful military dictator in the Goryeo dynasty era, and was executed for conspiring to rebel.

During the reign of King Uijong, the government relaxed the restrictions toward slaves and eunuchs by allowing them to take low offices, which caused some governmental irregularities. In the reign of King Myeongjong also saw the rise of the status of slaves. In 1197, Ch'oe Ch'ung-hŏn forced Myeongjong to abdicate, put King Sinjong on the throne, and became a military ruler with de facto control. During his government, Choe Chung-heon was less tolerant toward slaves, and several incidents involving slaves occurred in different places in Goryeo.

Manjeok and some other slaves plotted a rebellion in 1198 against their masters in Kaesong, the capital of Goryeo. A speech of his that questioned inequality was recorded in the history book Goryeosa. Another slave revealed the plot to his own master, and the plot failed. Manjŏk and many other slaves were executed.

== In popular culture ==
- Portrayed by Yoon Seung-won in the 2003–2004 KBS TV series Age of Warriors.
- Manjeok is the father of the protagonist in the Korean manhwa Mujang.
