= Duke Yangyang =

Wang Seo
- Marquess Deokyang (덕양후; 德陽侯); Duke Yangyang (양양공; 襄陽公)
- Born: after 1181; Goryeo
- Died: Unknown; Goryeo
- Issue: Wang Wi; Wang Byeong; Wang In; Wang Hui; Lady Wang
- House: House of Wang
- Father: Sinjong of Goryeo
- Mother: Queen Seonjeong
- Religion: Buddhism

Korean name
- Hangul: 왕서
- Hanja: 王恕
- RR: Wang Seo
- MR: Wang Sŏ

Royal title
- Hangul: 양양공, 덕양후
- Hanja: 襄陽公, 德陽侯
- RR: Yangyanggong, Deogyanghu
- MR: Yangyanggong, Tŏgyanghu

Wang Sŏ, known by his title of Marquess Deokyang and later Duke Yangyang, was a Goryeo Royal Prince as the second son of King Sinjong and Queen Seonjeong, also the only younger brother of King Huijong. Through his third son, he would eventually become an ancestor of King Gongyang. In 1204, his father visited his manor, but died there not long after that. In 1211, he was exiled alongside Huijong by Ch'oe Ch'ung-hŏn to Ganghwa Island.

== Family and ancestry ==
=== Close relatives ===
- Older brother: Wang Yŏng, King Huijong
  - Sister-in-law: Queen Seongpyeong of the Jangheung Im clan
    - Nephew: Duke Changwon
    - Nephew: Marquess Siryeong
    - Nephew: Duke Gyeongwon
    - Nephew: Grand Priest Wonjeong
    - Nephew: Grand Priest Chungmyeong
    - Niece: Queen Anhye
    - Niece: Princess Yeongchang
    - Niece: Princess Deokchang
    - Niece: Princess Gasun
    - Niece: Princess Jeonghui
- Younger sister: Princess Heungdeok
- Younger sister: Princess Gyeongnyeong
- Issue:
1. Wang Wi (왕위; d. 1216)
2. Wang Pyŏng (왕병)
3. Wang In, Duke Sian (왕인 시안공; d. 1275)
4. Wang Hŭi, Duke Yeongan (왕희 영안공; d. 1263)
5. Lady Wang of the Kaesong Wang clan (부인 개성 왕씨)

=== Ancestry ===
Ancestors of Duke Yangyang

Sukjong of Goryeo 고려 숙종
Yejong of Goryeo 고려 예종
Queen Myeongui 명의왕후
Injong of Goryeo 고려 인종
Yi Cha-gyŏm 이자겸
Queen Sundeok 순덕왕후
Grand Lady Ch'oe of Byeonhan State 변한국대부인 최씨
Sinjong of Goryeo 고려 신종
Im Ŭi 임의
Im Won-hu 임원후
Princess Consort Yi of Nakrang County 낙랑군부인 이씨
Queen Gongye 공예왕후
Yi Wi 이위
Grand Lady Yi of Jinhan State 진한국대부인 이씨
Wang Sŏ, Duke Yangyang 왕서 양양공
Munjong of Goryeo 고려 문종
Wang To, Duke Joseon 왕도 조선공
Royal Consort Ingyeong Hyeon-bi 인경현비
Wang On, Duke Gangneung 왕온 강릉공
Yi Chŏng 이정
Lady Yi of the Inju Yi clan 부인 인주 이씨
Lady Wang of Sangdang County 상당현군 왕씨
Queen Seonjeong 선정왕후
Lord Kim 김씨
Lord Kim 김씨
Lady Kim 부인 김씨

=== Descendants ===
Both of his eldest son and youngest son had no children.

From second son, Wang Pyŏng:

- Wang Hu (왕후)
- Wang Yu (왕유)
- Wang Hŭi (왕희)

From third son, Wang In, Duke Sian:

- Wang Chŏng (왕정 수사공)
- Princess Jeongsin of the Kaesong Wang clan (regnal name Jeonghwa), first wife of King Chungnyeol
- Wang Yŏng, Marquess Seowon and Duke Yeongheon (왕영 서원후 영헌공), married Lady Sunan of Byeonhan State of the Hwangbo clan (변한국순안비 황보씨)
  - Royal Consort Jeongbi of the Kaeseong Wang clan, third wife of King Chungseon of Goryeo
  - Wang Pun, Marquess Ikyang (왕분 익양후), married Lady Janggyeong of Jinhan State of the Miryang Park clan (진한국장경비 밀양 박씨)
  - Wang Chŏn, Prince Seoheung (왕전 서흥군)
- Wang Wŏn (왕원)
