= Princess Changrak =

Princess of Goryeo (fl. 13th century)

Princess of Goryeo
- Coronation: 1151
- Predecessor: Princess Deoknyeong
- Successor: Princess Yeonghwa
- Monarch: Wang Hae, King Injong
- Born: 1130; Goryeo
- Died: 1216 (aged 85–86); Goryeo
- Spouse: Wang Seong, first cousin
- Issue: Wang Won; Wang Jin; Queen Wondeok
- House: House of Wang (by birth and marriage)
- Father: Injong of Goryeo
- Mother: Queen Gongye of the Jangheung Im clan

Princess Changrak (Korean: 창락궁주; 창락공주; Hanja: 昌樂宮主; 昌樂公主; 1130–1216 (Note: In the Korean calendar (lunisolar), she died on 27th day of the 1st month of 1216.)) was a Goryeo Royal Princess as the third daughter of King Injong and Queen Gongye who would become the mother of King Gangjong's second wife, Queen Wondeok.

The princess was born in 1130 during her father’s 8th year of reign. In 1151, alongside her younger sister, Princess Yeonghwa, they formally became a princess (궁주; 宮主). Then, she married her paternal aunt's son, Wang Seong the Marquess Sinan (신안후 왕성; 1146–1178). Because they were descended from the same ancestor, the princess was also Wang Seong's paternal fourth cousin.

They later had a daughter, the future Queen Wondeok (원덕태후 류씨; 1161–1239), who married King Gangjong, and had two sons: Wang Won the Marquess Gyeseong (계성후 왕원; 1163–1240) and Wang Jin the Marquess Yeongin (영인후 왕진; 1165–?), who would become the father of King Huijong's second wife.

To honor his deceased maternal grandmother, King Gojong reduced the number of palace's side dishes and ordered his officials to wore mourning clothes for a day. Meanwhile, Wang Seong died in 1178 (8th years reign of King Myeongjong) and suspended the inquiry for three days.
