= Princess Gyeongnyeong =

Princess Gyeongnyeong 경녕궁주

Princess of Goryeo
- Coronation: 1199
- Predecessor: Princess Hyohoe
- Monarch: Wang Tak, King Sinjong
- Born: 1185; Gongeop-jigu, Kaeseong, Kingdom of Goryeo
- Died: Unknown; Goryeo
- Husband: Wang Jeong (m. 1201); fifth cousin once removed
- House: House of Wang (by birth and marriage)
- Father: Sinjong of Goryeo
- Mother: Queen Seonjeong

Princess Gyeongnyeong (Korean: 경녕궁주; Hanja: 敬寧宮主; 1185–?) was a Goryeo Royal Princess as the second and youngest daughter of King Sinjong and Queen Seonjeong, also the youngest sister of King Huijong, Duke Yangyang, and Princess Hyohoe.

She was born in 1185 and in 1199, she formally became a Princess (공주, 公主) when her older sister, Princess Hyohoe, died at 17 years old. Later, in 1201, she married Wang Jeong (왕정) and was given royal title Count Siheung (시흥백), later becoming Duke Hoean (회안공). Her husband was the brother of Queen Seongpyeong, the second wife of King Huijong making them in-law’s. With Wang Jeong, she had 3 sons and their second son later married Princess Suheung who was her grandniece. Wang Jeong was the descendant of Wang Gi, Duke Pyeongyang (왕기 평양공), King Hyeonjong's son. The Princess seemed to have died around the 13th century, and her husband died in 1234.

== Family ==
- Father: Sinjong of Goryeo (고려 신종; 1144–1204)
  - Grandfather: Injong of Goryeo (고려 인종; 1109–1146)
  - Grandmother: Queen Gongye (공예왕후; 1109–1183)
- Mother: Queen Seonjeong (선정왕후; 1137–1222)
  - Grandfather: Wang On, Duke Gangneung (왕온 강릉공; 1090–1146)
  - Grandmother: Lady Gim of the Gangreung Gim clan (강릉 김씨; 1090–?)
    - Older brother: Wang Seo, Duke Yangyang (왕서 양양공; 1170–?)
    - Older brother: Huijong of Goryeo (고려 희종; 1182–1237)
    - Older sister: Princess Hyohoe (효회공주; 1183–1199)
- Husband: Wang Jeong, Duke Hoean (왕정 회안공; 1185–1234); son of Wang Jin, Marquess Yeongin and Princess Yeonhui.
  - Son: Wang Yeon, Marquess Gyeyang (왕연 계양후; 1213–?)
  - Son: Wang Jeon, Duke Sinyang (왕전 신양공; 1215–1256) – married Princess Suheung.
  - Son: Wang Si (왕시; 1217–?)
