= Queen Sapyeong =

Goryeo crown princess (1158–1174)

Queen Sapyeong 사평왕후

Crown Princess of Goryeo
- Tenure: 3rd month 1174 – 12th month 1174 (lunar calendar)
- Coronation: 1174
- Predecessor: Crown Princess Wang
- Successor: Crown Princess Yu
- Born: 1158; Jeonju, North Jeolla Province, Goryeo
- Died: fl.1174 Goryeo
- Spouse: Crown Prince Wang Suk (m. 1174–1174)
- Issue: Princess Suryeong
Posthumous name
- Sapyeong (사평, 思平; "Thoughtful and Peaceful")
- House: Jeonju Yi clan
- Father: Yi Ui-bang
- Mother: Lady Jo
- Religion: Buddhism

Queen Sapyeong of the Jeonju Yi clan (Korean: 사평왕후 이씨; Hanja: 思平王后 李氏; 1158 – ?) was the first and primary wife of King Gangjong of Goryeo when he was still a crown prince who just reigned for 9 months. Descended from Yi Yong-bu, she would become the first cousin fifth removed to Yi Seonggye and only royal wife in Korean history who was born and came from the Jeonju Yi clan.

== Biography ==
=== Early life ===
The future Queen Sapyeong was born into the Jeonju Yi clan as the only daughter of Yi Ŭi-bang, son of Yi Yong-bu and Lady Cho in Jeonju, North Jeolla Province.

=== Marriage and later life ===
In 1174, she married Crown Prince Wang Suk as his primary and first wife since her father had a big influence in the court. However, after 5 months reign, her father was assassinated in the coup led by Chŏng Kyun (정균), son of Chŏng Chung-bu (정중부), which she later expelled from her position and out the palace according to the opinion that,

"You cannot have the rebel's daughter as a spouse and companion for you."
"반역자의 딸을 동궁의 배필로 둘 수 없다."

After her husband's ascension to the throne, she then received her title back and posthumously honoured as a Queen Consort. The couple had a daughter who later married Wang Ch'un, Duke Hawon (왕춘 하원공).

After that, her whereabouts has not appeared in both of Goryeosa or Goryeosajeolyo.

== Family ==
- Father: Yi Ŭi-bang (1121 – 12 January 1174)
  - Grandfather: Yi Yong-bu (이용부; 李勇夫; 1102 – ?)
  - Grandmother: Lady Yi of the Gyeongwon Yi clan (인천 이씨; 1102 – ?); youngest daughter of Yi Ho (이호, 李顥; 1040-?)
- Mother: Lady Cho (조씨; 曺氏) (1134 – ?); Yi Ŭi-bang's second wife
- Husband: Crown Prince Wang Suk (10 May 1152 – 26 October 1213); son of King Myeongjong and Queen Uijeong.
  - Daughter: Princess Suryeong (1178 – ?)

== In popular culture ==
- Portrayed by Park Eun-bin in the 2003–2004 KBS TV series Age of Warriors.
