= Princess Yeonhui =

Korean Royal Princess

Princess Yeonhui 연희궁주

Princess of Goryeo
- Coronation: 1173
- Successor: Princess Suan
- Monarch: Wang Ho, King Myeongjong
- Spouse: Wang Jin (m. 1179); fifth cousin
- Issue: Wang Jeong; Queen Seongpyeong
Regnal name
- Royal Princess of the Yeonhui Palace (연희궁공주, 延禧宮公主; given in 1173)
- House: House of Wang (by birth and marriage)
- Father: Myeongjong of Goryeo
- Mother: Queen Uijeong

Princess Yeonhui (Korean: 연희궁주; Hanja: 延禧宮主) was a Goryeo Royal Princess as the first and oldest daughter of King Myeongjong and Queen Uijeong, also the first younger sister of King Gangjong. In 1173, she formally called as Royal Princess of the Yeonhui Palace (연희궁공주; 延禧宮公主) and in 1179, she married Wang-Jin, Marquess Yeongin (왕진 영인후). He later died on 27 October 1220 (7th year reign of Gojong of Goryeo).

== Family ==
Her relationship with Sinjong was once "Niece-Uncle", but later became "In-law" since their child got married (King Huijong and Queen Seongpyeong).

- Father: Myeongjong of Goryeo (고려 명종; 1131–1202)
- Mother: Queen Uijeong (의정왕후)
  - Grandfather: Wang-On, Duke Gangneung (왕온 강릉공; d. 1146)
  - Grandmother: Lady Gim (부인 김씨)
  - Older brother: Gangjong of Goryeo (고려 강종; 1152–1213)
  - Younger sister: Princess Suan (수안궁주; d. 1199)
- Husband: Wang Jin, Marquess Yeongin (왕진 영인후; d. 1220) – also known as Count Yeongin (영인백); son of Wang Seong, Count Sinan (왕성 신안백; d. 1178).
  - Son: Wang-Jeong, Duke Hoean (왕정 회안공; d. 1234)
    - Daughter-in-law: Princess Gyeongnyeong (경녕궁주)
  - Daughter: Queen Seongpyeong (성평왕후; d. 1247)
    - Son-in-law: Huijong of Goryeo (고려 희종; 1181–1237)

== In popular culture ==
- Portrayed by Oh Soo-min in the 2003–2004 KBS TV series Age of Warriors.
