= Royal Consort Mu-Bi =

Goryeo consort (fl. 12th century)

Mu-Bi
- Spouse: Uijong of Goryeo
- Issue: 3 sons and 9 daughters
- Religion: Buddhism

Korean name
- Hangul: 무비
- Hanja: 無比
- Revised Romanization: Mubi
- McCune–Reischauer: Mu'pi

Mu-Bi (Korean: 무비; Hanja: 無比) was the concubine of King Uijong of Goryeo who was expelled from the palace during the Munsin Coup.

== Biography ==
She was initially a Palace Maid from Namgyeong (now Seoul), but was later favored by the King. "Mu-Bi" means "beyond compare", so it seems that she must have been a great beauty and they later had 3 sons and 9 daughters. It was unknown when the King's two queen consorts died or whether they lived until his abdication, but it's presumed that Mu-Bi had a prestige and influence within the court equal to these two queen consorts.

Mu-Bi was said to have been close with an eunuch, named Baek Seon-yeon who came from Namgyeong with her. While Uijong go to there, they were meet and Uijong then brought Baek to palace and called him Yang-ja (양자; 養子) and loved it. Since came from the same place and had the same status, so their attachment and solidarity between two of them in the spacious palace must have been different. Because of this, there were rumors the two of them had an adulterous relationship. Official Mun Geuk-gyeom (문극겸) also appealed to Baek's death and said that they were wasting wealth by seducing the King with the spirit and superstition of the magician by engaging in obscene behavior.

According to Annals of the King Uijong of Goryeo, pointed to Buddhism and ghost worship, flattering servants, deceitful eunuchs and magicians, and monarchs as the causes of his fall. In other words, it was written that a rebellion occurred because it wasn't possible to listen to the words of the royal family, who were full of slang and dissent from the royal court, in charge of the affairs of the monarch. Of course, it wouldn't have been because of them, and it would not have been a favorable evaluation since Uijong was ousted in a coup.

Although she gave birth to 3 princes and 9 princesses, her status was unavoidable. When her son-in-law, Choe Gwang-gyun (최광균) appointed as an exuberant officer, all the high-ranking officers were outraged and the officials refused to sign the appointment letter. The objection was strong because Goryeo was a class-based society and the category of kin was important not only to the paternal line, but also to the mother line or the in-law line. Although Choe's wife was the daughter of a King, her mother was of low birth, so her husband should also be restricted from public office. Mu-Bi's sons were not treated like royal princes and just called as "Little Master" (소군; 小君), also forced to be into middle class. From almost all of Goryeo's royal consorts, Mu-Bi was the one who didn't get Consort's royal title like, Gung-ju or Won-ju, Bi, etc.

During The Musin Rebellion (무신란), Mu-Bi fled to Cheonggyo Station (청교역; 靑郊驛), near Gaegyeong and hid there. Chŏng Chung-bu, who knew about this, tried to capture and kill her. Seeing this, the King's mother, Queen Mother Gongye, pleaded him to escape death and followed her son to Geoje. Three years later, Uijong was assassinated, after Uijong’s death there were no records about Mu-Bi's later life.

"Mu-Bi, who was born of low-class, became a Royal Concubine who was favoured by the King, Uijong, didn't get appointed and her 12 children weren't treated as royalty. It can be said that she became an existence that shows the status and characteristics of a concubine from the Goryeo Dynasty."

== In popular culture ==
- Portrayed by Kim Sung-ryung in the 2003–2004 KBS TV series Age of Warriors.
