= Princess Heungdeok =

Princess Heungdeok may refer to these Goryeo women:

- Queen Janggyeong (Goryeo) (died after 1170), wife of Uijong
- Princess Hyohoe (1183–1199), daughter of Sinjong
