= Queen Seonjeong (Sinjong) =

Goryeo queen consort (fl. 13th century)

Queen Seonjeong 선정왕후

Queen consort of Goryeo
- Tenure: 1197–1204
- Coronation: 1197
- Predecessor: Queen Jangseon
- Successor: Queen Seongpyeong

Queen dowager of Goryeo
- Tenure: 1204–1222
- Coronation: 1204
- Predecessor: Queen Dowager Gongye
- Successor: Queen Dowager Wondeok
- Monarch: King Huijong (son; 1204–1211)
- Died: 17 August 1222; Goryeo
- Burial: Jilleung tomb
- Spouse: Sinjong of Goryeo (before 1181)
- Issue: Huijong of Goryeo; Duke Yangyang; Princess Hyohoe; Princess Gyeongnyeong
Regnal name
- Duchess Consort Pyeongnyang (평량공비주, 平凉公妃主; when her husband was still "Duke Pyeongnyang"); The Primary Princess Consort (궁주 원비, 宮主 元妃; when her husband was appointed as "Royal Brother/Hwangtaeje"); The Supreme Imperial Mother (태상황모, 太上皇母; given by King Gojong); Queen Mother Seonjeong (선정태후, 宣靖太后); Grand Queen Mother Jeongseon (정선왕태후, 靖宣王太后)
Posthumous name
- Queen Sinheon Seonjeong (신헌선정왕후, 信獻宣靖王后); Queen Mother Sinheon Seonjeong (신헌선정태후, 信獻宣靖太后)
- House: Kim clan (official); House of Wang (agnatic and by marriage)
- Father: Wang On, Duke Gangneung
- Mother: Lady Kim

Queen Seonjeong of the Kim clan (Korean: 선정왕후 김씨; Hanja: 宣靖王后 金氏; d. 17 August 1222), also known as Queen Mother Seonjeong (선정태후; 宣靖太后) or Queen Mother Jeongseon (정선태후; 靖宣太后) was a member of the Goryeo royal family. Born as the youngest daughter of Duke Gangneung, a grandson of King Munjong, she became a queen consort through her marriage with her second half cousin once removed, King Sinjong. Her son, King Huijong became king after her husband's abdication. She was one of several Goryeo queens to take their mother's clan name over their father's and eventually became an ancestor of Gongyang. She was the youngest among Queen Janggyeong, Marchioness Daeryeong and Queen Uijeong.

== Biography ==
=== Early life and marriage ===
The future Queen Seonjeong was born as the fourth and youngest daughter of Wang On, Duke Gangneung. It was said that from childhood, she had a straight and bright personality, as well as having gentle and quietly behavior. She later changed her clan name to that of her mother's Kim clan, and married Duke Pyeongnyang, the youngest son of King Injong and Queen Gongye.

=== Palace life ===
In 1197, her husband succeeded King Myeongjong as King Sinjong and she then was honoured as a Primary Consort (원비; 元妃). She was reportedly a devoted and virtue wife to Sinjong, whom she advised and assisted in his royal duties, it was said that they two had a good and close relationship each other because of this.

In April 1204, when her husband abdicated and their son, Wang Yŏng ascended the throne as the new King, she was made Queen Dowager. King Huijong attempted to kill Ch'oe Ch'ung-hŏn, the de facto ruler of the nation, and was deposed. Then, her nephew Wang Suk ascended and after that was succeeded by his son, Wang Ch'ŏl. At this time, she had been queen dowager for 18 years.

It was said that she was excellent at weaved since young, even Ch'oe Ch'ung-hŏn deposed Huijong, she endured difficulties and was sober, so there were no any disturbance. But, when Ch'oe died, she always suffered and defended herself by refraining from suffering. As the Queen Mother, she then moved to Gyeongheung Mansion (경흥부; 慶興府) in Jangchu Hall (장추전; 長秋殿). Sometimes, her palace can be Eunggyeong Mansion (응경부; 膺慶府) in Subok Hall (수복전; 綏福殿). Even in a very chaotic situation when Gangjong and Gojong ascended the throne, she was admired by their peoples for showing off her dignified appearance as the eldest in the royal family.

According to Goryeosa, King Gojong raised empress dowager (황태후; 皇太后) to grand empress dowager (태황태후; 太皇太后) in 1123, but it was unclear whether it referred to her (Sinjong's widow) or Queen Wondeok (Gangjong's widow). If it was her, her title would be the Grand Empress Dowager Seonjeong (선정태황태후; 宣靖太皇太后) instead of Empress Dowager Seonjeong (선정황태후; 宣靖皇太后).

=== Arts ===
To honour his grandaunt, King Gojong ordered Yi Kyu-bo to write a poem to commemorate her. This poem, "Everything From the Grand Queen Dowager" (왕태후 만사) was recorded in the 16th volume of the Collected Works of Minister Yi of Korea and it was said that Seonjeong was given the honorary title of "The Supreme Imperial Mother" (태상황모; 太上皇母) during her lifetime, while her eldest son became "Retired Emperor" (상황; 上皇) and her granddaughter became "Queen Consort" (왕후; 王后). King Gojong praised her effort into the stability of the royal family, rather than getting involved in politics during Goryeo's difficult times.

=== Death and Posthumous name ===
The Queen Dowager outlived 18 years than her late husband and later on 17 August 1222 (9th year reign of King Gojong), she died and was buried in Jilleung Tomb (진릉; 眞陵), near Gaeseong, North Korea. Then, she was given a Posthumous name under King Gojong's command:

- In October 1253, name Sin-heon (신헌; 信獻) was added to her posthumous name.

The last King of Goryeo, Gongyang, was King Sinjong and Queen Seonjeong's descendant from their 2nd son, Duke Yangyang.
