= Wang Cheol =

Wang Cheol may refer to:

- Uijong of Goryeo (1127–1173), born Wang Cheol, king of Goryeo
- Gojong of Goryeo (1192–1259), personal name Wang Cheol, king of Goryeo
