= Duke Changwon =

Goryeo prince (1197–1262)

Wang Chi

Heir Successor (wonja) of Goryeo
- Reign: c.1200–1204
- Monarch: King Sinjong (grandfather)

Crown Prince of Goryeo
- Reign: 1204–1211
- Coronation: 1204
- Predecessor: Crown Prince Wang Yŏng
- Successor: Crown Prince Wang Chin
- Monarch: King Huijong (father)
- Born: 1197; Gaegyeong, Goryeo
- Died: 1262 (aged about 65/6); Goryeo
Regnal name
- The Deposed Crown Prince (폐태자; 廢太子); Marquess Changwon (창원후; 昌原侯); Duke Changwon (창원공; 昌原公)
- House: Wang
- Father: Huijong of Goryeo
- Mother: Queen Seongpyeong

Korean name
- Hangul: 왕지
- Hanja: 王祉
- RR: Wang Ji
- MR: Wang Chi

Wang Chi (1197–1262 (Note: In the Korean calendar (lunisolar), he died on 17th day and 12th month of 1262.)) was a Goryeo Royal Prince as the first and oldest son of King Huijong and Queen Seongpyeong, who got exiled to Inju following his father who was forced to abdicated the throne by Ch'oe Ch'unghŏn. Wang Chi was known for being the Deposed Crown Prince.

== Biography ==
Wang Chi was born in 1197 as the first child and son of Wang Yŏng, from his wife, Lady Im, making him became the eldest grandson to King Sinjong and Queen Seonjeong. He had four younger brothers and five sisters, which the first sister became the wife of the future King Gojong.

When King Myeongjong exiled by the Goryeo military regime, Wang T'ak, as his younger brother, succeeded the throne instead of his only son, Crown Prince Wang O. However, Wang T'ak suddenly died in 1204 and his eldest son, Wang Yŏng succeeded the throne. As a monarch's eldest son, the Heir Successor (원자; 元子) Wang Chi became the crown prince at the age 8 in 1204 and did the Guan Li seven years later in 1211.

However, the powerful Ch'oe Ch'ung-hŏn deposed King Huijong from the throne and sent him into exile at Ganghwa Island in the same year after Ch'oe discovered that Huijong plotted to kill him in a conspiracy along with his eunuch, Wang Chun-myŏng (왕준명) and others. Thus, Wang Chi was exiled to Inju and the former-crown-prince Wang O ascended the throne as King Gangjong in 1212.

After suffered throughout of his life and being pardoned, Wang Chi became Marquess Changwon (창원후; 昌原侯) and Duke Changwon (창원공; 昌原公) while later died unmarried at the age 66 in 1262 (3rd years reign of King Wonjong). There was no records left about where is his death place or tomb location.
