= Princess Seunggyeong =

Princess of Goryeo (fl. 12th century)

Princess of Goryeo
- Coronation: 1148
- Successor: Princess Deoknyeong
- Monarch: Wang Hae, King Injong
- Died: before 1158; Goryeo
- Spouse: Wang Yeong; half second cousin once removed
- Issue: Lady Wang; Wang Myeon
- House: House of Wang (by birth and marriage)
- Father: Injong of Goryeo
- Mother: Queen Gongye of the Jangheung Im clan

Princess Seunggyeong (Korean: 승경궁주; Hanja: 承慶宮主; died before 1158) or Royal Princess of the Seunggyeong Palace (승경궁공주; 承慶宮公主) was a Goryeo Royal Princess as the first and eldest daughter of King Injong and Queen Gongye, also the eldest aunt of Gangjong and Huijong.

In 1148, she, as the High Princess (상공주; 上公主) and her younger sister formally became a princess (궁주; 宮主). She later married Duke Gangneung's (강릉공) son, Wang Yeong the Count Gonghwa (공화백 왕영) and had a daughter and a son together. Their daughter died in 1185 unmarried, while their son married Seunggyeong's niece–Princess Hwasun (화순궁주) and died in 1218.

According to her daughter's epitaph (왕영녀왕씨묘지명; 王瑛女王氏墓誌銘), Princess Seunggyeong (Lady Wang's mother) died when Wang unreached the age of 7/8 years. From this point, Seunggyeong was believed to have died before 1158 since Wang was born in 1150.
