= Wang Gi =

Wang Gi may refer to:

- King Jeonggan (1021–1069), Hyeonjong of Goryeo's son
- Seonjong of Goryeo (1049–1094), Goryeo king
- Crown Prince Hyoryeong (1149–1170 or after), Uijong of Goryeo's son
- Gongmin of Goryeo (1330–1374), Goryeo king
