= Chungju Seok clan =

Korean clan from North Chungcheong Province

- Country: Korea
- Current region: Chungju
- Founder: Seok Rin
- Connected members: Suk Hyun-jun

Chungju Seok clan (Korean: 충주 석씨; Hanja: 忠州 石氏) was one of the Korean clans. Their Bon-gwan was in Chungju, North Chungcheong Province. According to the research in 2015, the number of Chungju Seok clan was 42811. Seok clan was born in China. Their founder was Seok Rin who was a serviceman in Goryeo during Uijong of Goryeo’s reign. Seok Rin served as military personnel. After that he was appointed as Prince of Yeseong (Hanja: 蘂城君). His descendant began Chungju Seok clan and made Chungju their Bon-gwan.

== See also ==
- Korean clan names of foreign origin
