= Princess Suan (Myeongjong) =

Princess of Goryeo (fl. 12th century)

Princess Suan 수안궁주
- Died: 23 June 1199; Goryeo
- Spouse: Wang U (m. 1179–1199); third cousin
- Issue: Wang Hyŏn; Crown Princess Wang
Regnal name
- Princess Suan (수안공주; 壽安公主); Royal Princess of the Suan Palace (Korean: 수안궁공주; Hanja: 壽安宮公主; given in 1173)
- House: House of Wang (by birth and marriage)
- Father: Myeongjong of Goryeo
- Mother: Queen Uijeong

Princess Suan (Korean: 수안궁주; Hanja: 壽安宮主; d. 23 June 1199) or called as Royal Princess of the Suan Palace (수안궁공주; 壽安宮公主) was a Goryeo Royal Princess as the second and youngest daughter of King Myeongjong and Queen Uijeong. She was the youngest sister of King Gangjong and Princess Yeonhui.

== Biography ==
=== Early life and marriage ===
The Princess's birth date was unknown, but she was the youngest child and daughter of King Myeongjong of Goryeo and Queen Uijeong.

In 25 April 1173, she and her elder sister, Princess Yeonhui was honoured as a Princess (공주; 公主) and she became Royal Princess of the Suan Palace (수안궁공주; 壽安宮公主). Then, in 1179, she married Wang U (왕우), and later honoured as Marquess Changhwa (창화후). They later went out from the palace in 1180 and had a nice life together. His mother, Princess Yeonghwa (영화궁주) was the Princess's aunt, so they two were a foreign cousin. After King Sinjong's ascension, Wang-U then assigned in Sangju State.

=== Palace life ===
Around 1170, her mother died. Ten years later, in 1180 (10th year reign of King Myeongjong), after the death of Myeongjong's favourite and beloved Palace woman Myŏng-ch'un (명춘; 明春), he couldn't bear his sorrow and among his concubines, there was no one he liked and loved. Then he invited his youngest daughter, Princess Suan, to take charge of various royal and court affairs, kept her from leaving his side day and night and sometimes slept with one blanket, covering her with great affection and loves her so much. Couldn't resist this order, the Princess's husband, Wang U living alone for several months, so he tried to divorce her.

When his father-in-law, King Myeongjong, heard if he wanted to divorce, Myeongjong then summoned Wang U and made him live in the Queen Mother's palace which located on the east side of "Suchang Palace" (수창궁; 壽昌宮). Every day, the Princess would go out in casual clothes and talk with him, then go back to her father's palace. It was not until November that Myeongjong returned them to their house.

=== Death ===
Later, on the 24th day, 4th month, 1199 of the Korean calendar (lunisolar), had been observed that the moon and Saturn violate each other. Seeing this phenomenon, a man named Jeong Tong-won (정통원) gave a fortune telling and said,

"In late June of this year, the boss of the female owner will be there."
"금년 6월 하순에, 여주(女主)의 상사가 있을 것이다."

Also, on 23 June 1199, the Princess died.

== Family ==
- Father: Myeongjong of Goryeo (1131–1202)
- Mother: Queen Uijeong
- Older brother: Gangjong of Goryeo (1152–1213)
- Older sister: Princess Yeonhui
- Husband: Wang U, Marquess Changhwa (왕우 창화후)
  - Son: Wang Hyŏn (왕현)
  - Daughter: Crown Princess Wang (태자비 왕씨)

== In popular culture ==
- Portrayed by Choi Ha-na in the 2003–2004 KBS TV series Age of Warriors.
