= Myeongjong =

Myeongjong may refer to:

- Myeongjong of Goryeo (r. 1170–1197)
- Myeongjong of Joseon (r. 1545–1567)

== See also ==
- Mingzong (disambiguation)
