= Queen Janggyeong =

Queen Janggyeong may refer to:

- Queen Janggyeong (Goryeo) (died after 1170), wife of Uijong of Goryeo
- Queen Janggyeong (Joseon) (1491–1515), wife of Jungjong of Joseon
