= Princess Deoknyeong (Goryeo) =

Princess of Goryeo (fl. 12th century)

Princess of Goryeo
- Coronation: 1148
- Predecessor: Princess Seunggyeong
- Successor: Princess Changrak
- Monarch: Wang Hae, King Injong
- Died: 1192; Goryeo
- Spouse: Wang Gam; first cousin once removed
- Issue: Crown Princess Hyoryeong
- House: House of Wang (by birth and marriage)
- Father: Injong of Goryeo
- Mother: Queen Gongye of the Jangheung Im clan

Princess Deoknyeong (Korean: 덕녕궁주; 덕녕공주; Hanja: 德寧宮主; 德寧公主; d. 1192) was a Goryeo Royal Princess as the second daughter of King Injong and Queen Gongye.

In 1148, she and her elder sister formally became a princess (궁주; 宮主). Then, she married her great-grandfather's grandson, Wang Gam the Duke Gangyang (강양공 왕감) and had a daughter who would marry Deoknyeong's nephew, Crown Prince Hyoryeong in 1168 and became the crown princess (태자비; 太子妃).

Princess Deoknyeong was said to have a very beautiful appearance, and can have a good conversation with everyone despite her elegant behavior. Due to this, her eldest brother who was the king–Uijong, invited her to the palace day and night, stayed with him, drank and sang together until got very drunk, which there was a scandal circulated outside the palace at this time. Thus, Uijong became very angry with official Mun Geuk-gyeom (문극겸) who appealed this fact to him and burned Mun's complaint, even demoted him to Hwangju.
