= Princess Hyohoe =

Goryeo princess (1183–1199)

Princess Hyohoe 효회공주
- Princess Heungdeok (흥덕궁주; 興德宮主)
- Born: 1183; Goryeo
- Died: 1199 (aged about 17); Goryeo
- Husband: Wang Chun; fifth cousin once removed
- House: House of Wang (by birth and marriage)
- Father: Sinjong of Goryeo
- Mother: Queen Seonjeong

Princess Hyohoe (Korean: 효회공주; Hanja: 孝懷公主; 1183–1199) or posthumously called Princess Heungdeok (흥덕궁주; 興德宮主) was a Goryeo Royal Princess as the first and oldest daughter of King Sinjong and Queen Seonjeong who was born when her father was still the Duke Pyeongnyang (평량공) and was the younger sister of King Huijong.

She married Wang Ch'un (왕춘) who was the descendant of Wang Ki, Duke Pyeongyang, the son of King Hyeonjong and then given a title as Duke Hawon (하원공). However, she later died in 1199 at 17 years old. Her death made her parents become very sad. After her death, her husband remarried with Princess Suryeong, only daughter of King Gangjong.

== Family ==
- Father: Sinjong of Goryeo (1144–1204)
- Mother: Queen Seonjeong (d. 1222)
- Older brother: Huijong of Goryeo (1181–1237)
- Older brother: Wang Sŏ, Duke Yangyang
- Younger sister: Princess Gyeongnyeong
- Husband: Wang Ch'un, Duke Hawon (왕춘 하원공)
