= Im Chung-sik =

South Korean general (1922–1974)

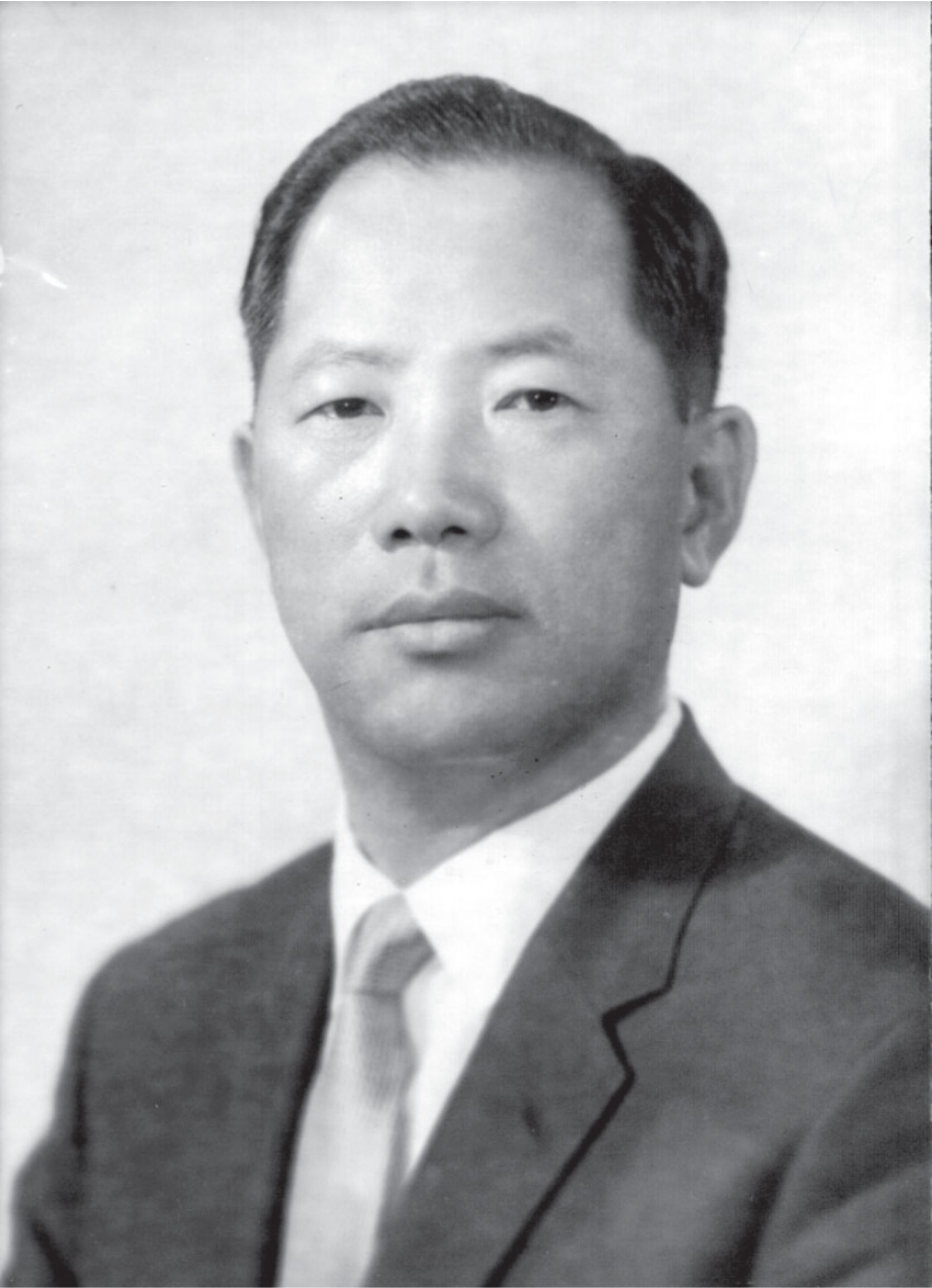

16th Minister of National Defense
- In office August 5, 1968 – March 10, 1970
- President: Park Chung Hee
- Prime Minister: Chung Il-kwon
- Preceded by: Choi Young-hee
- Succeeded by: Jeong Rae-hyuk

Personal details
- Born: April 23, 1922 Gyegok-myeon, Kainan-gun, Zenranan-dō, Chōsen, Empire of Japan
- Died: December 9, 1974 (aged 52) Seoul, South Korea
- Party: Independent politician

Korean name
- Hangul: 임충식
- Hanja: 任忠植
- RR: Im Chungsik
- MR: Im Ch'ungsik

Im Chung-sik (Korean: 임충식; April 23, 1922 – December 9, 1974) also spelled Yim Chung-sik, was a South Korean general and politician. His service started during the Korean War. His bongwan is Jangheung.

== Education ==
Im's graduated from the Korea Military Academy (1st alumni) in 1946. He graduated from the Republic of Korea Army Infantry School in 1949 and then after the Korean War graduated from the United States Army Field Artillery School in 1954. In 1956 Im graduated from the Republic of Korea Army College. He completed further post secondary education at the Korea National Defense University with a Bachelor of Public Administration in 1958 and a Master of Public Administration in 1966.

== Career ==
At the beginning of Korean War in 1950 Im was the head of the 18th regiment (lieutenant colonel) for the Republic of Korea Army (South Korea). He was promoted in 1952 to be division commander of the 7th Division. After the war in 1954 Im became division commander for the ROK Army 2nd Division.

In 1960 he moved to the ROK Army Headquarters and in 1962 became the commander of the ROK Army 5th Corps.

In 1963 he joined the ROK Department of Defense office and in 1965 was elevated to Army Deputy Chief of Staff

He served as Chairman of the ROK Joint Chiefs of Staff from April 1967 – August 1968 and then as ROK Minister of National Defense from August 1968 – March 1970

Im was a Member of Parliament (The 8th and 9th National Assembly)

== Honors ==
- ROK Army: Taegeuk Order of Military Merit (1953)
- ROK Army: Ulchi Order of Military Merit
- ROK Army: Chungmu Order of Military Merit
- ROK Army: Hwarang Order of Military Merit
- US Army: Silver Star (1950)
- US Army: Legion of Merit (1953)
