= Jeong Rae-hyuk =

South Korean politician (1926–2022)

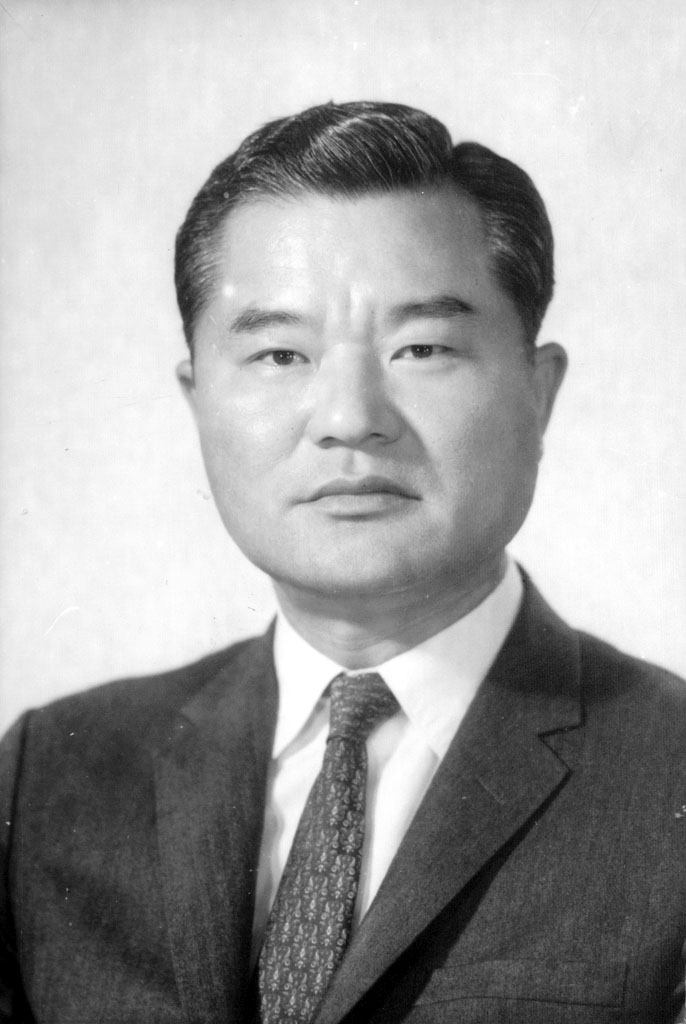

Member of the National Assembly of South Korea
- In office March 12, 1973 – April 10, 1985
- Constituency: Seongbuk-gu

17th Minister of National Defense
- In office March 10, 1970 – August 25, 1971
- President: Park Chung-Hee
- Prime Minister: Chung Il-kwon; Paik Too-chin
- Preceded by: Im Chung-sik
- Succeeded by: Yu Jae-hung

Minister of Commerce and Industry
- In office May 20, 1961 – July 10, 1962
- Preceded by: Tae Wanseon
- Succeeded by: Yoo Chang-soon

Personal details
- Born: 17 January 1926 Gokseong County, Korea, Empire of Japan
- Died: 17 May 2022 (aged 96) Seoul, South Korea
- Party: DRP; DJP
- Education: Korea National Defense University
- Occupation: Military officer

Korean name
- Hangul: 정래혁
- RR: Jeong Raehyeok
- MR: Chŏng Raehyŏk

Jeong Rae-hyuk (Korean: 정래혁; 17 January 1926 – 17 May 2022) was a South Korean military officer and politician. He served as Minister of Commerce and Industry from 1961 to 1962 and Minister of National Defense from 1970 to 1971. He was also a member of the National Assembly from 1973 to 1985. He died in Seoul on 17 May 2022 at the age of 96.
