= Duke Gangneung =

Goryeo nobleman (fl. 12th century)

- Born: Wang On; Goryeo
- Died: 1146; Goryeo
- Spouse: Lady Kim
- Issue: Queen Janggyeong; Marchioness Daeryeong; Queen Uijeong; Queen Seonjeong; Wang Yeong; Wang Jak
Regnal name
- Marquess Gangneung (강릉후, 江陵侯; 1143–1146)
Posthumous name
- Duke Gangneung (강릉공, 江陵公; given after his death in 1146)
- House: House of Wang
- Father: Wang Do, King Yangheon
- Mother: Queen Yangheon of the Incheon Yi clan

Korean name
- Hangul: 왕온
- Hanja: 王溫
- RR: Wang On
- MR: Wang On

Royal title
- Hangul: 강릉공, 강릉후
- Hanja: 江陵公, 江陵侯
- RR: Gangneunggong, Gangneunghu
- MR: Kangnŭnggong, Kangnŭnghu

Duke Gangneung (died 1146), personal name Wang On (Korean: 왕온; Hanja: 王溫), was a member of the royal family of Goryeo as the grandson of King Munjong. Through his daughters, he became the father-in-law of the three successive kings (Uijong, Myeongjong, Sinjong) and the maternal grandfather of Huijong and Gangjong. He was known before as Marquess Gangneung.

== Biography ==
=== Ancestors and relatives ===
Ancestors of Duke Gangneung

Wang Uk, King Hyoui 왕욱 효의왕
Wang Sun, King Wonmun 왕순 원문왕
Queen Hyosuk 효숙왕후
Wang Hwi, King Inhyo 왕휘 인효왕
Gim Eun-bu 김은부
Queen Wonhye 원혜왕후
Grand Lady of Ansan County, of the Inju Yi clan 안산군대부인 이씨
Wang Do, Duke Joseon 왕도 조선공
Yi Han 이한
Yi Ja-yeon, Duke Janghwa 이자연 장화공
Grand Lady of Naknang County, of the Gyeongju Choe clan 낙랑군대부인 최씨
Worthy Consort Ingyeong of the Inju Yi clan 인경현비 이씨
Kim In-wi 김인위
Grand Lady of Gyerim State, of the Gyeongju Kim clan 계림국대부인 김씨
Wang On, Duke Gangneung 왕온 강릉공
Yi Han 이한
Yi Ja-yeon, Duke Janghwa 이자연 장화공
Grand Lady of Naknang County, of the Gyeongju Choe clan 낙랑군대부인 최씨
Yi Jeong 이정
Kim In-wi 김인위
Grand Lady of Gyerim State, of the Gyeongju Kim clan 계림국대부인 김씨
Lady Yi, of the Incheon Yi clan 부인 인천 이씨
Wang Ga-do 왕가도
Lady Wang of Sangdang County 상당현군 왕씨
Lady Kim of Gaeseong County 개성군부인 김씨

Wang On had two older brothers, they were:

- Wang Ja (왕자, 王滋; before 1083–1101); died after became a swordsman.
- Wang Won (왕원, 王源; 1083–1170); given title of "Duke Gwangpyeong" (광평공; 廣平公) and married Princess Ansu, King Sukjong's daughter.

=== Biography ===
Not much information left about his life beside that he received the resident country from his half first cousin and in 1143, he received his royal title as Marquess Gangneung (강릉후; 江陵侯) under his half first cousin once removed's command. He was also given 700 Sik-eup (식읍 700호) and 300 Sik-sil (식실 300호), but eventually died in 1146 and received his new title as Duke Gangneung (강릉공; 江陵公).

=== Children and descendants ===
According to Goryeosa, Wang On had 4 daughters and 2 sons. As the same clan couldn't get married, so the three queens were followed their maternal clan ("Kim"; 김, 金) and since his 5 children were all married to King Injong's children, so Wang On and Injong have a five-fold in-law relationship.

- First daughter "Queen Janggyeong" (장경왕후; 莊敬王后)
  - Married Wang Hyeon, King Uijong; had a son and 3 daughters.
- Second daughter "Marchioness Daeryeong"
  - Married Wang Gyeong, Marquess Daeryeong; had no any issue.
- Third daughter "Queen Uijeong" (의정왕후; 義靜王后)
  - Married Wang Ho, King Myeongjong; had a son and 2 daughters.
- Fourth daughter "Queen Seonjeong" (선정왕후; 宣靖王后)
  - Married Wang Tak, King Sinjong; had 2 sons and 2 daughters.
- First son "Wang Yeong" (왕영; 王瑛)
  - It was said that he had a calm and quiet personality, not greedy and devoted himself to learning. He then married his half second cousin once removed, Princess Seunggyeong and became "Count Gonghwa" (공화백; 恭化伯), then died at 61 years old in 1186.
- Second son "Wang Jak" (왕작; 王鷟) He held the office of a comrade in the middle of the war.
