= Jangheung Im clan =

Korean clan from South Jeolla Province

Jangheung Yim (or Im) clan Gwansan Yim clan, Jeongan Yim clan
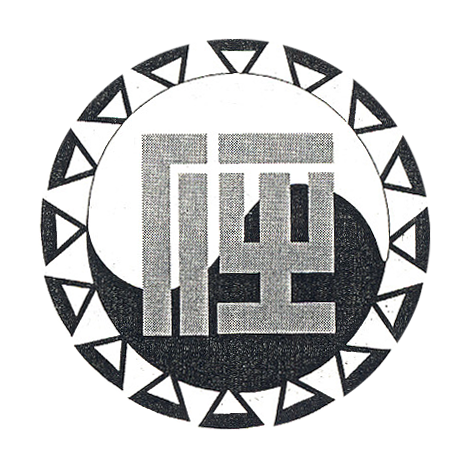
- Country: Korea
- Current region: Jangheung County
- Founder: YIM Ho
- Connected members: Queen Gongye; Im Chung-sik; Im Jong-seok

The Jangheung Yim (or Im) clan (Korean: 장흥 임씨; Hanja: 長興 任氏) is a Korean clan from Jangheung County, South Jeolla Province, with a recorded population of 37,584 in 2015.

== Goryeo Dynasty ==
Their founder, Yim Ho (임호; 任顥), settled in Jangheung. His son Yim Ui (임의; 任懿) became the highest-ranking government officer (중서문하평장사; 中書門下平章事) under King Yejong of Goryeo and was the grandfather of Queen Gongye. He also held the title of Duke of Jangheung, governing a vast area including present-day Jangheung County and parts of neighboring counties, such as Boseong, Suncheon, Haenam, Goheung, and Gangjin.

During the Goryeo period, Jangheung Yim clan produced three prime ministers (삼중대광 정1품 품계; 三重大匡 文官) and numerous ministers. They were one of the ten clans permitted to intermarry with the royal family. Notably, Queen Gongye of the clan mothered three kings: King Uijong of Goryeo, King Myeongjong of Goryeo, and King Sinjong of Goryeo.

== Joseon Dynasty ==
Due to their close ties to the Goryeo royalty, the Jangheung Yim clan initially abstained from government positions during the early Joseon era. However, with mounting internal and external challenges, clan members stepped up to serve as generals, mayors, and righteous army leaders. Yim Gye-young, for instance, fought against foreign invasions. Scholar Yim Hui-jong established a school and left behind a legacy, with one of his books preserved at UC Berkeley's East Asia library.

== South Korea ==
The clan continues to contribute to Korean society, boasting figures like Korean war hero General Yim Chung-shik, former Minister of Agriculture Yim Sang-gyu, politician Im Jong-seok, and various members serving in parliament, high-ranking government roles, and professions like law and scholarship.
