= Mingzong =

- Chinese: 明宗
- Literal meaning: Bright Ancestor
Transcriptions
Standard Mandarin
- Hanyu Pinyin: Míngzōng
- Wade–Giles: Ming^{2}-tsung^{1}

Mingzong is an imperial temple name used for Chinese emperors. It may refer to:

- Li Siyuan (867–933, reigned 926–933), Emperor Mingzong of Later Tang
- Khutughtu Khan Kusala (1300–1329, reigned in 1329), Emperor Mingzong of Yuan

== See also ==
- Myeongjong (disambiguation) (Korean equivalent)
- Minh Tông (disambiguation) (Vietnamese equivalent)
