= Age of Warriors =

South Korean television series

- Hangul: 무인시대
- Hanja: 武人時代
- RR: Muinsidae
- MR: Muinsidae
- Genre: Historical
- Written by: Yoo Dong-yoon
- Directed by: Shin Chang-suk; Kim Sung-geun; Yoon Chang-bum
- Starring: Seo In-seok; Kim Heung-ki; Park Yong-woo; Lee Deok-hwa; Kim Kap-soo
- Country of origin: South Korea
- Original language: Korean
- No. of episodes: 158

Production
- Executive producer: Lee Nok-young
- Producer: Jung Young-chul
- Running time: 50–60 minutes Saturdays and Sundays at 21:45 (KST)

Original release
- Network: KBS1
- Release: May 2, 2002 – September 26, 2003

Age of Warriors (Korean: 무인시대; RR: Muinsidae) is a South Korean historical television series. It aired on KBS1 from May 2, 2002 to September 26, 2003, every Saturday and Sunday at 21:45 (KST) for 158 episodes. It is KBS' third histocal series set in Goryeo after Taejo Wang Geon and The Dawn of the Empire, and the largest TV production of the time, with over 130 major actors and a total production cost of 30 billion won.

Written by Yoo Dong-yoon and directed by Yoon Chang-bum and Shin Chang-suk, the series covers 50 years of the military rule over Goryeo, from the coup in 1170 until the death of Choe Chung-heon in 1219, and was filmed predominantly on open sets at Mungyeong, North Gyeongsang, and Jecheon, North Chungcheong.

Age of Warriors recorded a viewership rating of 20–23% in about a month after its first broadcast. It was appreciated for its non-stop battle scenes, the fast story development, and the detailed and realistic portrayal of the endless plots and massacres to seize power.

== Cast ==
=== Main characters ===
- Seo In-seok as Yi Ui-bang
- Kim Heung-ki as Jeong Jung-bu
- Park Yong-woo as Gyeong Dae-seung
- Lee Deok-hwa as Yi Ui-min
- Kim Kap-soo as Choe Chung-heon
  - Ryu Deok-hwan as young Choe Chung-heon

=== Royal household ===
Male member

- Lee Sung-ho as King Injong, 17th monarch
- Lee Dong-shin as Wang Ji-in, Injong's half brother
- Lee Hwa-jin as Wang Gak-gwan, Injong's half brother
- Kim Kyu-chul as King Uijong, 18th monarch
- Kim Kyung-eung as Marquess Daeryeong
- Kim Byung-se as King Myeongjong, 19th monarch
- Lee Woo-suk as King Sinjong, 20th monarch
- Jung Tae-woo as King Huijong, 21st monarch
- Na Kyung-min as Marquess Deokyang
- Son In-woo as Duke Changwon
- Park Byung-sun as King Gangjong, 22nd monarch
  - Lee In (Note: Credited as Lee Joon.) as young King Gangjong (Crown Prince Wang Suk)
- Oh Hyun-chul as King Gojong (Crown Prince Wang Cheol), 23rd monarch
- Jung Yoon-suk as Crown Prince Wang Jeon, later the 24th monarch King Wonjong
- Park Gun-woo as Yi Ui-min's second son

Female member

- Kim Yoon-kyung as Empress Dowager Im
- Kim Bo-mi as Empress Seonpyeong
- Park Eun-bin as Queen Sapyeong, Ui-bang's daughter
- Chae Min-seo as Queen Seongpyeong
- Jo Yang-ja as Queen Wondeok
- Yoon Ji-yoo as Queen Anhye
- Choi Jung-won as Queen Janggyeong
- Choi Ha-na as Princess Suan, Myeongjong's second daughter
- Oh Soo-min as Princess Yeonhee, Myeongjong's first daughter
- Yoo Hye-jung as Lady Im, Empress Dowager Im's little sister
- Lee Ja-young as Myung-Choon, Myeongjong's concubine
- Go Eun-mi as Soon-Joo, Myeongjong's concubine

Palace servant

- Jung Yong-sook as Court Lady Choi, Myeongjong's maid
- Heo Jin as Court Lady Jo, Gongye's maid
- Ahn Hae-sook as Court Lady Jang
- Yoo Byung-joon as Wang Gwang-chwi, Uijong's eunuch who died during the rebellion
- Yoo Byung-han as Hansuk
- Lee Choon-shik as Eunuch Choi
- Lee Kyung-young as Eunuch Jo, Myeongjong's eunuch

=== Ministers and warriors ===
- Joo Hyo-man as Kim Boo-shik
- Kim Jong-kyul as Moon Geuk-kyum
- Park Young-ji as Kim Don-joong, Boo-shik's son
- Heo Ki-ho as Lee Gong-seung
- Shin Dong-hoon as Moon Jang-pil
- Park Byung-ho as Jo Young-in
- Choi Sang-hoon as Jo Choong, Young-in's son
- Jung Jin-kak as Han Roi
- Yoo Soon-chul as Im Jong-shik
- Kim In-tae as Yoon In-chum
- Yang Hyung-ho as Woo Seung-kyung
- Kim Joon-mo as Yoo Eung-kyoo
- Kim Sung-won as Han Moon-joon
- Nam Young-jin as Wang Jun-myung
- Lee Il-woong as Lee In-ro
- Jung Woon-yong as Uhm Shin-yak
- Jang Chil-koon as Geum Ui
- Cha Kwang-soo as Lee Kyoo-bo
- Maeng Ho-rim as Im Yoo
- Shin Won-kyoon as Kim Koon-soo

Warriors of Uijong's era

- Kim Ki-bok as Baek Im-ji
- Kim Kyoo as Jung Se-yoo
- Lee Gye-young as Jung Jon-shil

=== Rebellion people ===
- Park Kyung-deuk as Han Sun
- Kwon Hyuk-ho as Kim Bo-dang
- Song Jong-won as Jang Soon-suk
- Yang Jae-won as Han Un-kook
- Choi Dong-joon as Jo Wi-chong
- Baek Seung-woo as Jo Kyung, Wi-chong's son
- Jeon Byung-ok as Kim Jon-shim
- Hwang Duk-jae as Hyun Duk-soo
- Lee Chi-woo as Hyun Dam-yoon, Duk-soo's father
- Park Jin-sung as Mang Yi
- Ham Suk-hoon as Mang So-yi
- Oh Sung-yul as Lee Gwang
- Lee Jae-yun as Son Chung
- Yoon Seung-won as Man-jeok
- Myung Ro-jin as Soon Jung
- Jung Doo-hong as Mi Jo-yi
- Ko Kyu-pil as Yun Bok
- Han Tae-il as Hyo Sam
- Won Wan-kyoo as Hyun Oh
- Kang Ji-hoo as Kim Sa-mi
- Kim Young-suk as Hyo Shim
- Im Jung-il as Lee Bi
- Bang Hyung-joo as Pae Jwa

People from Silla

- Moon Hoi-won as Kim Ja-yang
- Choi Dong-kyoo as a man who longing for the noble position
- Lee Do-ryun as Kim In-kyum

People in Jin dynasty

- Moon Hoi-won as Emperor Sejong, the 5th Emperor
- Park Woong as Bo, a member of the royal family
- Kim Dae-hwan as Wanyan Heng, a member of the royal family
- Joo Jin-mo as Imperial Prince Wanyan Yungong
- Shin Joon-young as Yayool Kyoo
- Lee Hyo-jung as Suk To-heuk, Sejong's father-in-law
- Park Yoo-seung as a translator
- Kim Jin-oh as Sa-sin

People in Song dynasty

- Lee Jung-yong as Emperor Heumjong, the last Emperor
- Choi Woo-hyuk as Crown Prince Zhao Chen
- Shin Goo as an old man (merchant)

People in Eastern Jin

- Yoo Dong-keun as Puxian Wannu, the 1st ruler
- Lee Ui-sun as General Wanyan Ziyuan

People in Mongol Empire

- Kim Myung-soo as Genghis Khan, the 1st Emperor
- Kil Yong-woo as Imperial Prince Ögedei
- Ji Dae-han as Imperial Prince Chagatai
- Lee Gye-young as General Sallita
- Kim Joo-ho as a Marshal general
- Go Tae-san as Vice Marshal Poridaewan
- Lee Doo-sup as Yelü Chucai
- Ahn Seung-hoon as Yelü Liuge, a vassal from Khitan Liao

People in Khitan Liao

- Ra Jae-woong as Yelü Sibu, the 1st monarch of Later Liao
- Jin Bong-jin as Gulno, the 2nd monarch of Later Liao
- Kim Kyung-ryong as Prince Geumsan, Prince of Georan and later the 3rd monarch of Later Liao
- Jung Ho-keun as Hamsa, the 5th monarch of Later Liao
- Jo Joo-hyun as a general
- Jeon Il-bum as a military officer
- Park Yoon-bae as a soldier

People in Western Xia

- Jung Bo-suk as Emperor Yangjong, the 7th monarch.
- Uhm Chul-ho as Lee Joon-wook

People in Khwarazmian Empire

- Jo Kyung-hwan as Jalal al-Din Mangburni, the last Sultan.

=== Other ===
- Park Jun-gyu as Yi Go
- Kim Ae-ran as Lady Park
- Lee Min-woo as Jeong Gyeon
- Kim Hyung-il as Choe Chung-su
- Jung Jae-gon as Choe Woo
  - Lee David as young Choe Woo
- Choi Sung-joon as Choe Hyang
  - Shin Seung-joon as young Choe Hyang

== Awards and nominations ==
Year	Award	Category	Recipient	Result
2003	KBS Drama Awards	Best Actor	Park Yong-woo	Won
