= Marquess Daeryeong =

Korean prince (fl. 12th century)

Prince of Goryeo
- Coronation: 1148
- Born: Wang Kyŏng; 1130; Goryeo
- Died: fl. 1167; Goryeo
- Spouse: Lady Wang, Marchioness Daeryeong
- House: Wang
- Father: Injong of Goryeo
- Mother: Queen Gongye of the Jangheung Im clan

Marquess Daeryeong (Korean: 대령후; Hanja: 大寧侯; b. 1130), personal name Wang Kyŏng (왕경; 王暻) was a Goryeo Royal Prince as the second son of King Injong and Queen Gongye, also the older brother of Myeongjong and Sinjong. His mother always preferred him and wanted to pass the crown prince title to him instead of his brothers, but his father never agreed to it. Due to this, he had conflicts with King Uijong after his ascension.

He was married to Wang On, Duke Gangneung (강릉공 왕온)'s second daughter.

== Biography ==
Wang Kyŏng was born in 1130 as the second son of King Injong and his consort, Queen Gongye. He was the younger brother of the future King Uijong. Their mother, Queen Gongye, openly preferred her second son, Kyŏng, to succeed King Injong, rather than his older brother. Uijong ultimately succeeded Injong as the next king after the royal tutor's support. Due to Queen Gongye's open support against him and for his younger brother, King Uijong did not trust his mother's clan, the Jangheung Im clan, nor his brother. In 1148 (Uijong's 2nd years reign), Wang Kyŏng was appointed as a "Marquess" ' (후; 侯) along with his younger brother–Wang Ho and won many people's trust for his magnanimity. However, his eldest brother–the king, was jealous of their mother's favour towards him and accused him for having a grudge against the king by plotting a conspiracy to take over the throne, along with eunuch Chŏng Ham (정함), Chŏng Su-gae (정수개), and Yi Pin (이빈), but Wang Kyŏng was able to prove that he was innocent and had no interest in usurping his brother's throne. Since this, Uijong tried to remove those who involved, but at Kim Chon-jung (김존중)s request, he sent relevant government officers to investigate the facts and the charges were not proven later. Then, he tattooed Su-gae's face and exiled him to Heuksan island while Yi Pin was exiled to Unje county.

Prior to this, Kim had a gap with the queen mother's brother-in-law, Chŏng Sŏ (정서) and her younger brother, Im Kŭk-chŏng (임극정). Chŏng Sŏ, who had a frivolous temperament and has been befriended Wang, was reported to Uijong by Chŏng Ham who tried to avoid his own sin. At this time, the king was puzzled since the prime minister Ch'oe Yu-ch'ŏng (최유청), Yu P'il (유필), officer Ch'oe Cha-yŏng (최자영), Wang Sik (왕식), Kim Yŏng-bu (김영부), and Pak So (박소) were also involved in this matter.

In Eosadae (어사대; 御史臺), Chŏng Sŏ secretly reformed a friendship with many members of the royal clan and held a drinking party every night. He even imprisoned Yi Si (이시) with the help of his assistant, Yang Pyŏk (양벽), Kim Ŭi-ryŏn (김의련), Yu U (유우). Meanwhile, they all were forgiven by Uijong, but got rid of Wang Kyŏng by abolished his Daeryeong manor (대령부), exiled his servant–Kim Ch'am (김참) to Hwain along with beaten and exiled Ch'oe Ye (최예).

In Daegan (대간; 臺諫), Wang Kyŏng prostrated himself at the palace gate again and demanded punishment for the five men, even the chief minister Ch'oe Yun-ŭi went straight to the king's residence and had a quarreled. Knowing this, Uijong summoned Yi Pin back to Gaegyeong, exiled Chŏng Sŏ to Dongnae, Yang Pyŏk to Hoejin, Kim Ŭi-ryŏn to Cheongju, and Kim Ch'am was moved to Bakdo.

In 1157 (Uijong's 11th years reign), Wang Kyŏng was exiled to Cheonan-bu while Chŏng Sŏ was exiled to Geoje-hyeon, Ch'oe Yu-ch'ŏng was demoted as a Chungjumoksa (충주목사; 忠州牧使) again, Im Kŭk-chŏng became Yangjubangeosa (양주방어사; 梁州防禦使), Chŏng Sŏ's brother-in-law–Kim Yi-yŏng became Jiseungpyeonggunsa (지승평군사; 知昇平郡事), and Yi Chak-sŭng became Namhaehyeollyeong (남해현령; 南海縣令). Meanwhile, Ch'oe Ye (최예) was pardoned and able to return to Gaegyeong, which he secretly made a traitor impeach Wang Kyŏng, Im Kŭk-chŏng, and others, also forced the queen dowager to go to the Boje Temple (보제사; 普濟寺). After that, many people were arrested one after another and Marquess Daryeong's servants (include Na-ŏn (나언; 羅彦), Yu-sŏng (유성; 有成), and Hwang-ik (황익; 黃益)) were suspected and severely interrogated until they made a false confession. Their family were also beheaded and ministers, officials, royal family elders came to the palace to salute the arrest of the criminal.

== In popular culture ==
- Portrayed by Kim Kyung-eung in the 2003–2004 KBS TV series Age of Warriors.
