= Queen Seongpyeong =

Goryeo crown princess (fl. 13th century)

Queen Seongpyeong 성평왕후

Crown Princess of Goryeo
- Tenure: ?–1211
- Predecessor: Deposed Crown Princess Wang
- Successor: Crown Princess Gim

Queen consort of Goryeo
- Tenure: 1211–1211
- Coronation: 1211
- Predecessor: Queen Seonjeong
- Successor: Queen Wondeok
- Died: 1249 (aged about late 60s); Ganghwa-gyeong, Goryeo
- Burial: Soreung tomb, Ganghwa-gun, Incheon-si
- Spouse: Huijong of Goryeo (before 1211)
- Issue: Sons: Wang Chi Wang Wi Wang Cho Wang Kyŏng-ji Wang Kak-ŭng; Daughters: Princess Seungbok Princess Yeongchang Princess Deokchang Princess Gasun Princess Jeonghui
Regnal name
- Princess Hampyeong (함평궁주, 咸平宮主; given in 1211)
Posthumous name
- Queen Jeongjang Seongpyeong 정장성평왕후 (貞章成平王后)
- House: Jangheung Im clan (official); Wang (agnatic and by marriage)
- Father: Wang Chin, Marquess Yeongin
- Mother: Princess Yeonhui

Queen Seongpyeong of the Jangheung Im clan (Korean: 성평왕후 임씨; Hanja: 成平王后 任氏; d. 1249) was a Goryeo royal family member and queen consort through her marriage with King Huijong as his second wife and followed her maternal clans as a result.

== Life ==
She was born into the royal House of Wang as the daughter of Wang Chin, Marquess Yeongin (왕진 영인후) and Princess Yeonhui who was the daughter of King Myeongjong, making her became both of first cousin once removed (maternal) and fifth cousin (paternal) to her future husband. In 1211 (7th year reign of her husband), she was given the Royal title Princess Hampyeong (함평궁주; 咸平宮主) and formally became the queen consort. Together, they had 5 sons and 5 daughters. When her husband tried to kill Ch'oe Ch'ung-hŏn at Suchang Palace (수창공), he failed and was forced to abdicate the throne as a result. Then, Huijong and their eldest son were exiled to modern-day Incheon and she became the only senior member left in the main palace, which believed that it was due to her close relationship with the next Kings, Gangjong and Gojong.

Upon the Goryeo-Mongol war breaking out, the court moved the Palace and she later died without being able to leave Ganghwa-gyeong (강화경; 江華京) on 1247 (34th year reign of Gojong of Goryeo). The queen was later buried in Soreung tomb (소릉; 紹陵) and received Jeongjang (정장; 貞章) as her posthumous name given by King Gojong in 1253.

== In popular culture ==
- Portrayed by Chae Min-seo in the 2003–04 KBS1 TV Series Age of Warriors.
