= Yi Ŭibang =

Goryeo military ruler (1121–1175)

Military Leader of Goryeo
- In office 1170–1175
- Monarchs: King Uijong; King Myeongjong
- Preceded by: Position established
- Succeeded by: Chŏng Chungbu

Personal details
- Born: 1121
- Died: 1175 (aged 53–54)
- Spouse: Lady Cho
- Children: Queen Sapyeong (daughter)
- Parents: Yi Yong-bu (father); Lady Yi (mother)

Korean name
- Hangul: 이의방
- Hanja: 李義方
- RR: I Uibang
- MR: I Ŭibang

Yi Ŭibang (Korean: 이의방; Hanja: 李義方; 1121 – January 12, 1175 (Note: In the Korean calendar (lunisolar), he died on the 18th day of the 12th Lunar month of the 4th year of Myeongjong's reign (1174).)) was a military ruler of Korea during the Goryeo period. He was one of many military dictators of Goryeo in the aftermath of the 1170 warrior rebellion.

== Early life ==
Yi Ŭibang’s ancestral home (bongwan) was Jeonju. In the late reign of King Uijong, while holding the junior 8th-rank post of san-won (an honorary, non-executive rank), he served as gyeonnyong haengsu (chief of the royal bodyguard unit “Leading the Dragon”).

== Mushin Revolt ==
In August 1170 (Uijong 24th year), he joined the Goryeo warrior rebellion, which occurred in defiance against the typically minister ruled Korea. Primary leaders of this rebellion was Chŏng Chungbu and Yi Ko who found that warrior-class treatment was truly unfair and planned a coup d'état to establish a warrior government.

At this time, tensions ran high between the civil officials (munsin) and the military officers (musin) in Goryeo. Although the official rank system was the same for both up to the 3rd rank, the highest positions—those of jaechu (chief ministers)—were reserved exclusively for civil officials. Civil servants, especially those who had passed the state examinations, enjoyed far higher social prestige and privileges.

Goryeo’s civil governance (munch'i) made this arrangement seem reasonable, but in practice, it led to some civil officials openly belittling and insulting military officers. King Uijong’s indulgence in pleasure with his civil-official favorites only deepened resentment. Meanwhile, the common soldiers lived in poverty. The coup was thus the product of a mix of political, social, and economic grievances.

Before the coup, Yi Ŭibang and Yi Ko are said to have approached other military officers to plan a revolt. Records in the Goryeosa tell how, in August 1170, while King Uijong was on an outing drinking and composing poetry with civil officials, his escorting soldiers grew hungry and resentful. Yi Ŭibang and Yi Ko used this moment to enlist Chŏng Chungbu in their plot.

Not long after, on the king’s return journey, the royal party stopped at Bohyeonwon outside Gaegyeong. Here, Yi Ŭibang and the others finally drew their swords. They had already assembled the Sungeom-gun (Patrolling Army) and moved to arrest and execute the king’s close civil aides. The Goryeosa describes corpses piled “like mountains,” attesting to the bloodshed.

After detaining the king outside the capital, Yi Ŭibang and Yi Ko led elite troops to seize Gaegyeong before the gates could be closed and the crown prince mobilized. They stormed the palace, the crown prince’s residence, and key government offices, shouting, “Any wearing the civil official’s hat—clerks included—kill them all!” Around 50 civil officials were slaughtered.

To pacify the mutineers, King Uijong promoted them to higher posts. Yi Ŭibang was appointed Jungnangjang (Lieutenant General) of the Eungyang Yongho (Hawk-Raising, Dragon-Tiger Guard), and his elder brother Yi Jun-ui was appointed Seungseon (royal secretary). On August 30, they returned him to the palace, and the situation seemed to subside.

But on September 1, court eunuch Wang Gwang-chwi attempted to raise forces to suppress the coup. The plan leaked, and some military leaders, including Yi Ko, sought to kill the king. This was stopped by other officers. The following day, Yi Ŭibang and his allies deposed Uijong, exiling him to Geoje Island, and enthroned his younger brother as King Myeongjong.

Myeongjong rewarded the coup leaders, naming Yi Ŭibang Daejanggun Jeonjunggwan (Grand General and Palace Guard Commander), and Jibju (Keeper of the Palace Decrees). Though officially appointments of the new king, they were in reality self-assigned spoils of victory. Yi had thus leapt from junior 8th rank to the second-highest military rank of senior 3rd class in a single stroke.

With Myeongjong’s accession, Chŏng Chungbu became Chamji Jeongsa (a ministerial post equivalent to a chief councillor), while Yi Ŭibang and Yi Ko became grand generals. Many others involved in the coup also rose sharply in rank and position, filling high offices far above their previous station. The three leaders even divided between themselves three of Uijong’s private residences, and were honored as Byeoksang Gongsin (Meritorious Subjects of the Wall), their portraits hung in the Hall of Meritorious Subjects.

== Governance ==
The military regime formed immediately after the revolt. This regime was an alliance between those who had taken a moderate stance during the uprising and those who had led it. Chŏng Chungbu, Yang Suk, Yi Soeung, and Gi Takseong were among the moderates, while Yi Ko, Yi Ŭibang, and Chae Won were leaders of the revolt. In reality, however, the key power seems to have been held by those who had led the uprising. This is suggested by the fact that the subsequent power struggles occurred mainly between Yi Ŭibang, Yi Ko, and Chae Won—excluding Chŏng Chungbu. When King Myeongjong ascended the throne, he appointed the following officers to these positions:

- Chŏng Chungbu: Chamji Jeongsa (Associate Chancellor of the State)
- Yang Suk: Chamji Jeongsa (Associate Chancellor of the State)
- Yi Soeung: Jwasangi Sangsi (Left Royal Attendant)
- Yi Ko: Daejanggun (Grand General), Wiwi-gyeong (Minister of the Guards), Jipju (Keeper of the Palace)
- Yi Ŭibang: Daejanggun (Grand General), Jeonjunggam (Palace Guard Commander), Jipju (Keeper of the Palace)
- Gi Takseong: Eosadaesa (Chief Censor)
- Chae Won: Janggun (General)

=== Consolidating his power ===
In 1171 (the 1st year of King Myeongjong’s reign), when Grand General Han Sun and Generals Han Gong, Shin Dae-ye, Sa Jik-jae, and Cha Jung-gyu spoke ill of him, Yi Ŭibang—though on friendly terms with Cha Jung-gyu—exiled him and executed the rest. He also began to resent Yi Ko, who had formed ties with rogues and Buddhist monks such as Suhye of Beopunsa Temple and Hyeonso of Gaeguksa Temple, and who harbored ambitions beyond his station. Yi Ko had been the most vehemently anti-civil-official among the coup leaders, even trying to kill all surviving civil officials until Chŏng Chungbu stopped him. In January 1172, when a coming-of-age ceremony (wonbok) was held at Yeojeong Palace for the Crown Prince, Yi Ŭibang and Ch'ae Wŏn attended as Sŏnhwasa (the official in charge of flower offerings) and used the occasion to kill Yi Ko. The Goryeosa claims Yi Ko had plotted to make himself king and planned to start an uprising at the banquet, but that the plot was leaked and Yi Ŭibang struck first with the help of the officer Chae Won. Yi Ŭibang ambushed Yi Ko with an iron club, killing him. He released the Sungeomgun (patrolling troops) to capture and kill Yi Ko’s mother and followers, and exiling his father. Three months later Chae Won and his faction was also killed by Yi Ŭibang, ostensibly for plotting to kill all court officials. During this process, Chŏng Chungbu, fearing harm might come to him, resigned from his post and secluded himself.

After Yi Ko and Chae Won were eliminated, Yi Ŭibang monopolized the military regime. However, it seems that Chŏng Chungbu's influence could not be completely ignored. Yi Ŭibang personally visited the reclusive Chŏng Chungbu with liquor and forged a father-son bond with him. Through this compromise, Yi Ŭibang sought to pacify opposition from senior military officials that might arise from his monopoly on power. As someone who had held low-ranking positions before the uprising, Yi Ŭibang could not afford to alienate senior officers after coming to power.

Yi Ŭibang’s conciliatory stance toward senior military officers can also be seen in his policies toward the Jungbang (Council of Generals). After the revolt, the Jungbang’s authority was greatly expanded. Since the first regime established after the uprising was Yi Ŭibang’s, it can be said that the strengthening of the Jungbang began under his rule. The council, composed of generals and grand generals, gained increased authority, which likely reflected Yi Ŭibang’s political consideration for the senior military class.

Alongside this, Yi Ŭibang also had to pay attention to the lower-ranking officers he had relied upon during the uprising. Many of these men, from humble origins, were promoted significantly under his regime—a clear indication of his efforts to reward them.

In 1173 (Myeongjong 3), a royal princess was granted to him as wife, making her a gungju (palace lady of high rank). In the Jungbang (Military Council), he drank and caroused with courtesans alongside other generals, making such a commotion that the noise reached the palace, yet showing no fear. He rose to the posts of Wiwi-gyeong (Minister of the Palace Guard), Heungwiwi Seop Daejanggun (Acting Grand General of the Heungwi Guard), and Ji Byeongbusa (Director of the Ministry of War). Military men were appointed to local magistrate posts, which had traditionally been reserved for civil officials, thereby opening a new career path for them. This measure appears to have been more for the benefit of lower-ranking officers than for senior generals.

== Rebellions ==
From 1173 (3rd year of Myeongjong), armed resistance to military rule began to emerge. While earlier plots had been small and easily crushed, this time real military confrontations broke out.

=== Kim Bodang's Rebellion ===
In August 1173, Yi Ŭibang’s regime faced a crisis when it encountered resistance from civil officials—most notably in the Rebellion of Kim Bodang.

Kim Bodang was not an outright opponent of the military regime—his participation in it proves as much. He had harbored considerable dissatisfaction with the politics of King Uijong’s reign and had once advocated the impeachment of those who had endorsed the eunuch Chŏng Ham’s appointment shortly after the revolt. Han Ŏn'guk, his co-conspirator, also had experience serving in the military regime, having overseen the civil service examinations in the 2nd year of Myeongjong’s reign as Right Remonstrance Minister. There is no detailed record of why they turned against the regime, but given that Kim Bodang justified his uprising by calling for the removal of Yi Ŭibang and Chŏng Chungbu and the restoration of Uijong. Although dissatisfied with Uijong’s politics, it is clear they disapproved of Uijong’s deposition and Yi Ŭibang’s seizure of power.

Kim Bodang, Dongbukmyeon Byeongmasa (Military Commander of the Northeast) and Ganuidaebu (Remonstrance Minister), conspired with Han Eon’guk, Dongbukmyeon Ji Byeongmasa (Military Affairs Officer of the Northeast), to raise troops. Kim Bodang proclaimed that his cause was the removal of Yi Ŭibang and Chŏng Chungbu and the restoration of King Uijong. Yi Ŭibang appointed Jang Sunseok and Yu Injun as Namno Byeongmasa (Commander of Southern Route Forces), Bae Yunjae as Seohaedo Byeongmasa (Commander of Western Sea Route Forces), and sent Jang Sunseok and others to Geoje to escort the exiled Uijong to Gyeongju. Upon hearing this, Yi Ŭibang ordered Yi Ŭimin to kill Uijong. With the king’s death, Kim Bodang’s forces lost their momentum and collapsed.

During the suppression of Kim Bo-dang’s forces, Yi Ŭibang appointed his cousin Yi Chun-bu as Southern Route Pacification Commissioner alongside Du Gyeong-seung, overseeing the campaign. He strengthened his faction by granting posts to loyal military officers and sealing alliances through marriage. It is thought that the policy of sending many military men as provincial governors during his rule was connected to his consolidation of power.

The rebellion was suppressed in only three months, but its impact was significant. Facing execution, Kim Bodang falsely declared, “There is no civil official who did not conspire with me,” which resulted in a mass slaughter of civil officials. This event, called the Gyesa Rebellion (癸巳의亂), saw such heavy casualties among the civil class that it is often grouped with the Musin Rebellion (of the Gyeongin year) under the name Gyeong-Gye Rebellions (庚癸의亂). Afterward, the political position of civil officials was further weakened. His elder brother Yi Jun-ui persuaded him to ease tensions by promoting marriages between military and civil officials, which temporarily calmed matters.

=== Revolt of the Monks ===
In March 1174, Yi Ŭibang married his daughter to the crown prince, aiming to place his future grandson on the throne. As his power grew, so did his arrogance and tyranny. Drinking late into the night with high-ranking officers in the Jungbang (central military council) was the least of it.

When over 100 monks from Guibeopsa Temple invaded the north gate of the capital and killed Seon-yu, the Seungnok (chief of monastic affairs), Yi Ŭibang led troops to repel them. Soon after, about 2,000 monks from various temples—including Junggwang, Hongho, Guibeop, and Honghwa—burned the Sungin Gate and attempted to kill Yi Ŭibang and his brother. Yi Ŭibang assembled Bubyeong (local troops), killing over 100 monks, and went on to destroy and burn numerous temples—including Junggwang, Hongho, Guibeop, Yongheung, Myoji, and Bokheung—seizing vast amounts of wealth.

When his brother Yi Jun-ui rebuked him, saying,

“You have committed three great evils: first, driving the king into exile, killing him, and taking his house and concubines; second, threatening and committing adultery with the Queen Dowager’s younger sister; third, monopolizing national affairs.”

Yi Ŭibang tried to kill him, but was stopped by Mun Geuk-gyeom.

=== Jo Wi-Chong's Rebellion ===
Jo Wi-chong, Seogyeong Yusu (Military Governor of the Western Capital) and Byeongbu Sangseo (Minister of War), denounced Yi Ŭibang and Chŏng Chungbu for killing Uijong without giving him a proper burial, and declared:

“I hear that the Jungbang in Gaegyeong recently discussed the rough and hostile nature of the northern frontier fortresses, and decided to attack and destroy them. They have already mobilized a large army—shall we sit and wait for death? Gather your troops and assemble in Seogyeong without delay!”

He sent this proclamation to various fortresses in the northeastern frontier, and over 40 strongholds north of Jeoryeong (or Jabi Pass) responded, giving the rebellion great momentum and advanced to the outskirts of Gaeseong. Yi Ŭibang captured and executed high-ranking officials from Seogyeong—including Sangseo Yun In-mi, Grand General Kim Deok-sin, and General Kim Seok-jae—and displayed their heads in the marketplace. He appointed Yun Injam, Jungseo Silang Pyeongjangsa (Vice Chancellor of State), as commander to lead three armies against Jo Wi-chong, but the government forces were defeated at Jeoryeong Station. He then marched north to suppress the rebels, advancing as far as the Daedong River. However, the scattered Seogyeong forces regrouped and fortified their defenses, leading Yi Ŭibang to camp outside the city for about a month before withdrawing due to severe cold.

=== Downfall and death ===
Yi Ŭibang exercises his power (wi-bok) at will and disrupting the court, amassing deep resentment among many. Back in Gaegyeong, he began preparations for another campaign against Jo Wi-Chong, even conscripting monks into his forces. Then, in the midst of these preparations, he was lured into an ambush outside Seonuimu Gate by Buddhist monk Chongch'am in collusion with Chŏng kyun, son of Chŏng Chungbu. His associates, including his brother Yi Jun-ui’s allies Go Deuk-won and Yu Yun-won, were also killed, and his daughter was deposed as Crown Princess. Fearing unrest, Chŏng Chungbu explained the circumstances to calm the troops. With Yi Ŭibang dead, power returned to Chŏng Chungbu.

== Evaluation ==
The Goryeosa later noted that “the central military council’s dominance over national affairs was entirely Yi Ŭibang’s doing.” This same source records that after his death, ten monks, including Jongcham—who had taken part in his assassination—were exiled to remote islands.

General Yi Ŭibang's main legacy remains in the balance that was achieved through the purging of scholars during his co-governance with Chong. Before the arrival of Yi, the scholar class had more influence in the government to the extent that the warrior-class was greatly mistreated. With the changing of kings and shifting of power from scholar-class to warrior-class, Goryeo faced a new era. A final and very important legacy is his connection with the founder of the Joseon Dynasty, Yi Sŏnggye. Yi Ŭibang's younger brother Yi In was a 6th generation ancestor of Yi Sŏnggye, thus connecting Yi Ŭibang and Yi Sŏnggye together.

== Popular culture ==
- Portrayed by Seo In-seok in the 2003–2004 KBS TV series Age of Warriors.

== See also ==
- History of Korea
- List of Goryeo people

== Notes ==
Preceded by –	Military Leader of Goryeo ?–1174	Succeeded by Chŏng Chungbu
