= Queen Gongye =

Queen Gongye 공예왕후

Queen consort of Goryeo
- Tenure: 1126–1146
- Coronation: 1126
- Predecessor: Lady Yeondeok; Lady Bokchang
- Successor: Queen Janggyeong

Queen dowager of Goryeo
- Tenure: 1146–1183
- Coronation: 1146
- Predecessor: Queen Dowager Myeongui
- Successor: Queen Dowager Jeongseon
- Monarch: King Uijong (son; 1146–1170); King Myeongjong (son; 1170–1183)
- Born: 2 October 1109; Dangdong village, Okdang-ri, Gwansan-eup, Jangheung-gun, Goryeo
- Died: 2 December 1183 (aged 72); Kaesong, Goryeo
- Burial: Sunreung tomb
- Spouse: Injong of Goryeo (m. 1126–1146)
- Issue: Sons: Uijong of Goryeo Marquess Daeryeong Myeongjong of Goryeo Wang Ch'ung-hŭi Sinjong of Goryeo; Daughters: Princess Seunggyeong Princess Deoknyeong Princess Changrak Princess Yeonghwa Princess Wang
Regnal name
- Princess Yeondeok (연덕궁주; 延德宮主; from 10 May 1129); Queen Mother Gongye (공예태후; 恭睿太后); Grand Queen Mother Gongye (공예왕태후; 恭睿王太后)
Posthumous name
- Gongye (공예; 恭睿; "Reverent and Perspicacious")
- House: Jangheung Im clan
- Father: Im Wŏn-hu
- Mother: Lady Yi of the Bupyeong Yi clan

Queen Gongye of the Jangheung Im clan (Korean: 공예왕후 임씨; Hanja: 恭睿王后 任氏; 2 October 1109 – 2 December 1183 (Note: In the Korean calendar (lunisolar), she was born on 7 September 1109 and died on 22 November 1183.)) was a Korean queen consort as the 3rd wife of King Injong of Goryeo. As his favourite and beloved wife, she was the mother of his three successors (Uijong, Myeongjong, Sinjong) and most of his children.

== Biography ==
=== Early life ===
The future Queen Gongye was born into the Jangheung Im clan on 7 September 1109 in Dangdong village, Okdang-ri, Gwansan-eup, Jangheung County, South Jeolla Province as the eldest child and daughter of Im Won-hu. Her mother was from the Bupyeong Yi clan and was the first wife of Im Won-hu.

As the oldest, she had five younger brothers and a younger sister who would eventually become the mother of the future Queen Jangseon; making Lady Ch'oe both the queen's maternal niece and daughter-in-law.

=== Youth life ===
When she was 15 years old in 1123, she was promised to marry Kim In-gyu (김인규)'s son, Kim Ch'i-hyo (김지효) from the Gyeongju Kim clan. However, when Kim arrived at his house, she suddenly fell ill and was on the verge of death. Knowing this, her father, Im Wŏn-hu, canceled the marriage between two and instead went to a fortune teller. That fortune teller then said that the girl was destined to become queen.

Eventually, this rumor was heard by Yi Cha-gyŏm, who was Goryeo's military leader at this time. Fearing that Im Won-hu's daughter could become the new queen meant that powerful Inju Yi clan will end in downfall. With his influence, Yi arranged the marriage of his 3rd and 4th daughters to become King Injong's queen consorts.

Im Wŏn-hu was later honoured as Gaeseong Ambassador. In 1126, when Yi Cha-gyŏm's rebellion ended in failure, his two daughters were stripped of their positions and kicked out of the palace.

=== Marriage and Palace life ===
That same year, there was a selection held to choose the next Queen and Lady Im had become the chosen one just as the fortune teller foretold. Lady Im entered the palace not long after that.

Lady Im and Injong then formally married on 20 June 1126 at 18 years old and became the new Queen Consort of Goryeo. One year later, on 11 April 1127, she gave birth into their eldest son, Prince Wang Hyŏn. On 10 May 1129, Injong gave her Singyeong Mansion (선경부; 善慶府) in Hudeok Hall (후덕전; 厚德殿), one of the royal halls in "Yeondeok Palace" (연덕궁; 延德宮), as her palace, having her honoured as Princess Yeondeok (연덕궁주; 延德宮主).

In the following years, she gave birth to their second son Prince Wang Kyŏng in 1131, third son Prince Wang Ho in 1132, and fourth son, Prince Wang T'ak in 1144. In 1148, she bore Injong their fifth and last son, Prince Ch'ung-hŭi.

Besides having five sons, they also had 5 daughters. It was said that Injong loved her so much that he elevated her birthplace from "Jangheung-bu" (장흥부; 長興府) to "Jijangheung-busa" (지장흥부사; 知長興府事). Her mother, Lady Yi, was also formally called "Grand Lady of the Jinhan State" (진한국대부인; 辰韓國大夫人).

=== Children's succession to the throne ===
After Injong's death on 10 April 1146, their eldest son, Wang Hyeon, ascended the throne as King Uijong. Thus having her become Queen Mother and lived in Hudeok Hall (후덕전; 厚德殿).

Uijong also built Seongyeong Mansion (선경부; 善慶府). However, Uijong was said to be often drunk, which further angered the warriors. Knowing her eldest son's behaviors and being skeptical of his qualifications, the Queen Mother chose to favor her 2nd son, Marquess Daeryeong and wanted to replaced Uijong with him. Ever since knowing this, she and Uijong had a bad relationship and those who conspired with her 2nd son got into a rebellion incident that occurred in 1151.

To protect her beloved son, the Queen Mother persuaded Uijong to provide safety for his younger brother, but Uijong expressed his disappointment from past events. Then, when going out from the palace on her socks, she looked up to the sky, swore an oath to plead her injustice. Suddenly, thunder and lightning struck from heaven and it was said that Uijong repented his mistakes. But in the autumn 1170, after constant discriminations, the rage of the military officials burst and started a military revolt, murdering the civil officials, deposing Uijong, and appointing a new king in his place (Wang Ho as King Myeongjong).

Although she intended that their second son should succeed in the throne, he was assassinated because Chŏng Chung-bu feared that he might become a threat to him in the future. Chŏng then choose the weak Wang Ho, due to believing that the true rulers were the military leaders at the time. During Myeongjong's reign, the Queen Mother became ill and the King then called his younger brother, Wang Ch'ung-hŭi to take care of her. However, as the beloved one, Ch'ung-hŭi then died in 1182, she then thought to herself that she had angered the gods and the souls of those who had been killed by Ch'ung-hŭi, so she couldn't withstand the shock and became ill for some days.

=== Later life, death, and funeral ===
When Duke Pyeongnyang was suffering from hemorrhoids, he could not greet his mother for a long time, and so she thought again that this son had suffered the same anger as his older brother, Ch'ung-hŭi. One year later, Wang T'ak finally healed from his illness and went to greet and comfort her by Myeongjong's order. Exactly on 2 December 1183, the Queen Mother died at 74 years old due to her ongoing illness and then received her posthumous name. She is buried in Sunreung Tomb (순릉; 純陵).

In 1184, the Jin Dynasty under Emperor Shizong, paid some tributes to Goryeo to express his condolences.

== Family ==
- Father: Im Wŏn-hu (임원후; 任元厚; 1089–1156)
- Mother: Grand Lady Jinhan of the Bupyeong Yi clan (진한국대부인 이씨, 韓國大夫人 李氏; 1090–?); second daughter of Yi Wi (이위; 李瑋; 1049–1133)
- Siblings
  - Younger sister - Lady Im of the Jangheung Im clan (장흥 임씨; 1110–?)
  - Younger brother - Im Gyu (임규; 1130–?)
  - Younger brother - Im Tak (임탁, 任濯; 1135–?)
  - Younger brother - Im Hang (임항; 任沆; 1140–November 1191)
  - Younger brother - Im Pu (임부; 任溥; 1145–?)
  - Younger brother - Im Yu (임유; 任濡; 1149–1212)
- Husband: Wang Hae, King Injong (29 October 1109 – 10 April 1146)
  - Father-in-law: Wang U, King Yejong (11 February 1079 – 15 May 1122)
  - Mother-in-law: Queen Sundeok of the Inju Yi clan (1094–1118)
- Issue(s)
  - Princess Deoknyeong (1125–1192); married Wang Kam, Duke Gangyang (강양공 왕감; 1119–?), first daughter
  - Princess Seunggyeong (승경궁주; 1126–1158); married Wang Yŏng, Marquess Gonghwa (1126–1186), second daughter
  - Wang Hyŏn, King Uijong (23 May 1127 – 7 July 1173); married Queen Janggyeong, first son
  - Princess Changrak (1130–1216); married Wang Sŏng, Marquess Sinan (신안후 왕성; 1146–1178), third daughter
  - Wang Ho, King Myeongjong (8 November 1131 – 3 December 1202); married Queen Uijeong (1132–?), second son
  - Wang Kyŏng, Marquess Daeryeong (1132–1167?); married Marchioness Daeryeong (1135–?), (Note: She was the eldest younger sister of Queen Uijeong) third son
  - Princess Yeonghwa (영화궁주; 1141–1208); married Wang Gong, Marquess Soseong (소성후 왕공; 1141–?), fourth daughter
  - Wang T'ak, King Sinjong (11 November 1144 – 15 February 1204); married Queen Seonjeong (1137–1222), fourth son
  - Princess Wang of the Kaeseong Wang clan (부부인 개성 왕씨; 1146–?); married Prince Sangrak, Kim Si-heung (문과급제 상락군 김시흥; 金時興; 1097–?) of the Gimnyeong Kim clan (김녕 김씨; 金寧 金氏), fifth daughter
  - Wang Ch'ung-hŭi (1148–1183), fifth son

== In popular culture ==
- Portrayed by Kim Yoon-kyung in the 2003–2004 KBS TV Series Age of Warriors.
