= Queen Uijeong =

Goryeo queen (fl. 12th century)

Queen Uijeong 의정왕후
- Grand Queen Mother Gwangjeong (광정왕태후, 光靖王太后)
- Died: c.1170 Goryeo
- Spouse: Myeongjong of Goryeo (before 1152)
- Issue: Gangjong of Goryeo; Princess Yeonhui; Princess Suan
Posthumous name
- Queen Gwangjeong (광정왕후, 光靖王后; given by King Myeongjong after 1170); Queen Gyeongsun (경순왕후, 景順王后; appeared in Ch'oe Ch'ung-hŏn's records); Queen Mother Gongpyeong Gwangjeong (공평광정태후, 恭平光靖太后; given by King Gangjong in 1211)
- House: Kim (official); Wang (agnatic and by marriage)
- Father: Wang On, Duke Gangneung
- Mother: Lady Kim

Queen Uijeong of the Kim clan (Korean: 의정왕후 김씨; Hanja: 義靜王后 金氏; d. c.1170) or known as Queen Mother Gwangjeong (Korean: 광정태후; Hanja: 光靖太后) was a Goryeo royal family member as the third daughter Duke Gangneung who married her half second cousin once removed, King Myeongjong as his first and primary wife. She was also the mother of his only successor and two daughters.

From all of her families' records, just she who didn't appear clearly about her life. It was believed that she married Myeongjong when he was still "Marquess Ikyang" (익양후) and "Duke Ikyang" (익양공), but eventually died after his ascension to the throne succeeded his brother, King Uijong. Seeing that their eldest son was born in 1152, so the couple was presumed to marry prior to this date. After this son ascended the throne in 1211, he honoured his late mother as a "Queen Dowager" and gave her a posthumous name. Although she never became a queen consort, dying before her husband became king, she was posthumously given the title of one.

== Posthumous name ==
- In October 1253 (40th year reign of King Gojong), name Gong-pyeong (Korean: 공평; Hanja: 恭平) was added to her posthumous name.
