= Uijong of Goryeo =

King of Goryeo from 1146 to 1170

Uijong 의종 毅宗

King of Goryeo
- Reign: 1146–1170
- Coronation: 1146; Daegwang Hall, Gaegyeong, Goryeo
- Predecessor: Injong of Goryeo
- Successor: Myeongjong of Goryeo
- Born: Wang Cheol; 23 May 1127; Yeondeok Palace, Gaegyeong, Goryeo
- Died: 7 November 1173 (aged 46); North Pond of Gonwon Temple, Dongyeong, Goryeo
- Burial: Huireung (희릉; 禧陵)
- Queen Consort: Queen Janggyeong (m. 1146) Queen Jangseon (m. 1148)
- Concubine: Lady Mubi (m. 1152)
- Issue: Sons: Crown Prince Hyoryeong 3 other sons; Daughters: Princess Gyeongdeok Princess Anjeong Princess Hwasun 9 other daughters
Posthumous name
- Great King Ganggwa Janghyo 강과장효대왕 (剛果莊孝大王)
Temple name
- Uijong (의종; 毅宗)
- House: Wang
- Dynasty: Goryeo
- Father: Injong of Goryeo
- Mother: Queen Gongye

- Uijong of Goryeo
- Hangul: 왕현
- Hanja: 王晛
- RR: Wang Hyeon
- MR: Wang Hyŏn

Monarch name
- Hangul: 의종
- Hanja: 毅宗
- RR: Uijong
- MR: Ŭijong

Courtesy name
- Hangul: 일승
- Hanja: 日升
- RR: Ilseung
- MR: Ilsŭng

Posthumous name
- Hangul: 장효대왕
- Hanja: 莊孝大王
- RR: Janghyo daewang
- MR: Changhyo taewang

Former name
- Hangul: 왕철
- Hanja: 王徹
- RR: Wang Cheol
- MR: Wang Ch'ŏl

Uijong (23 May 1127 – 7 November 1173), personal name Wang Hyŏn, was the 18th king of the Goryeo dynasty of Korea.

He honoured his civilian advisors with many ceremonies, but discriminated against the military officials, often forcing them to participate in martial arts competitions to entertain himself and the civil officials, as well as assigning them petty portions during land distributions. He also was often drunk, further angering the warrior class.

In the autumn of 1170, constant discriminations caused the rage of the military officials to finally burst. Three warriors (Chŏng Chung-bu, Yi Ŭi-bang, Yi Ko) and others mounted a coup d'etat, murdering civil officials, deposing Uijong, and appointing his young brother as the new king in the place. After he was dethroned, officials loyal to Uijong such as Kim Po-dang later attempted to restore him, but the attempt was exposed and Uijong was subsequently thrown into a pond and drowned by the Goryeo military regime, while many civil officials were again purged.

== Family ==
- Father: Injong of Goryeo
  - Grandfather: Yejong of Goryeo
  - Grandmother: Queen Sundeok of the Gyeongwon Yi clan
- Mother: Queen Gongye of the Jangheung Im clan
  - Grandfather: Im Won-hu
  - Grandmother: Grand Lady, of Jinhan State of the Bupyeong Yi clan (진한국대부인 부평 이씨)
- Consorts and their Respective issue(s):
1. Queen Janggyeong of the Gangneung Kim clan, half second cousin once removed.
  1. Princess Gyeongdeok, 1st daughter
  2. Princess Anjeong, 2nd daughter
  3. Wang Ki, Crown Prince Hyoryeong, 1st son
  4. Princess Hwasun, 3rd daughter
2. Queen Jangseon of the Jiksan Choe clan – No issue.
3. Concubine Mubi
  1. 3 daughters and 9 sons, all were unknown.

== Popular culture ==
- Portrayed by Kim Kyu-chul in the 2003–2004 KBS TV series Age of Warriors.

Uijong of Goryeo House of Wang Born: 23 May 1127 Died: 7 November 1173
Regnal titles
Preceded by Injong	King of Goryeo; 1146–1170	Succeeded by Myeongjong
