= Huijong of Goryeo =

King of Goryeo from 1204 to 1211

Huijong 희종 熙宗

King of Goryeo
- Reign: 1204–1211
- Coronation: 1204; Grand Hall Kaegyŏng
- Predecessor: Sinjong of Goryeo
- Successor: Gangjong of Goryeo
- Born: Wang Yŏn; 21 June 1181; Kaegyŏng, Goryeo
- Died: 31 August 1237 (aged 56); Beopcheonjeong Temple, Gyodong-hyeon, Yanggwang-do, Goryeo
- Burial: Seokneung (석릉; 碩陵); San–182, Giljeong-ri, Yangdo-myeon, Ganghwa County, Incheon
- Spouse: Deposed Crown Princess Wang Queen Seongpyeong (before 1211)
- Issue: Sons: Wang Chi Wang Wi Wang Cho Wang Kyŏng-ji Wang Kak-ŭng; Daughters: Princess Seungbok Princess Yeongchang Princess Deokchang Princess Gasun Princess Jeonghui
Posthumous name
- Great King Inmok Seonghyo 인목성효대왕 (誠孝仁穆誠孝大王)
- House: Wang
- Father: Sinjong of Goryeo
- Mother: Queen Seonjeong
- Religion: Buddhism

Korean name
- Hangul: 왕영
- Hanja: 王韺
- RR: Wang Yeong
- MR: Wang Yŏng

Monarch name
- Hangul: 희종
- Hanja: 熙宗
- RR: Huijong
- MR: Hŭijong

Courtesy name
- Hangul: 불피
- Hanja: 不陂
- RR: Bulpi
- MR: Pulp'i

Posthumous name
- Hangul: 성효대왕
- Hanja: 誠孝大王
- RR: Seonghyo daewang
- MR: Sŏnghyo taewang

Former names
- Hangul: 왕연, 왕덕
- Hanja: 王淵, 王悳
- RR: Wang Yeon, Wang Deok
- MR: Wang Yŏn, Wang Tŏk

Huijong (21 June 1181 – 31 August 1237), personal name Wang Yŏng, was the 21st king of the Goryeo dynasty of Korea.

It is said of King Huijong that if he were to have grown old he would have made a great king. When his father ascended to the throne and Huijong became Crown Prince, he rebelled against Ch'oe Ch'ung-hŏn, the military leader of that time, and his younger brother Ch'oe Ch'ung-su. Huijong grew truly hostile towards them after Ch'ung-su forced the Crown Princess to abdicate so that he could replace her with his daughter. During the rebellion, Huijong masterminded a plan to make Ch'ung-hŏn kill Ch'ung-su, but Ch'ung-hŏn found out about it. Huijong was forced to beg for forgiveness and humble himself before one of his own subjects, which only made him hungrier for revenge.

When King Sinjong fell ill in 1204, he stepped down from the throne to let his son Huijong be king. Huijong, knowing that he had to lull Ch'oe Ch'ung-hŏn into a false sense of security in order to be able to kill him, promoted him to Prime Minister of the State. This title was the one most often given out during the time of military rule to people such as Chŏng Chung-bu, Yi Ŭi-min, and even Ch'ung-hŏn's father posthumously. Huijong also named Ch'ung-hŏn the Royal Protector, the greatest honor of the time, which was usually only given to relatives of the King. With these two titles, Ch'oe Ch'ung-hŏn had political power nearly equal to that of the King himself. He used it to obliterate three rebellions, one led by his slave, another by Silla partisans, and one by his nephew Pak Chin-jae (박진재; 朴晋材).

As Ch'ung-hŏn became secure in his new position, however, Huijong began to make preparations. Claiming illness, he tricked Ch'oe Ch'ung-hŏn into coming alone into the palace without his usual host of guards. Once he arrived, Huijong attempted a coup d'état against him. Unfortunately, this failed and Ch'oe Ch'ung-hŏn barely escaped with his life. Enraged, he exiled King Huijong to Yeongjongdo. Ch'ung-hŏn had realized by this time that he held the 'power of the heavens' in his hand, and could crown and exile whomever he wished whenever he wished. King Gangjong was crowned in Huijong's place. Huijong was later allowed to go to Ganghwa Island by Ch'oe, who exercised moderation and leniency to the dethroned Hujiong, though Huijong was later exiled back to Yeongjongdo by Ch'oe's son Ch'oe U after he caught wind of Huijong's attempts to plot a restoration.

== Family ==
- Father: Sinjong of Goryeo
  - Grandfather: Injong of Goryeo
  - Grandmother: Queen Gongye of the Jangheung Im clan
- Mother: Queen Seonjeong of the Gangneung Kim clan
  - Grandfather: Wang On, Duke Gangneung
  - Grandmother: Lady, of the Gangneung Kim clan
- Consorts and their Respective issue(s):
1. Deposed Crown Princess Consort, of the Kaesong Wang clan (b. 1185); third cousin once removed – No issue.
2. Queen Seongpyeong of the Jangheung Im clan; fifth cousin.
  1. Princess Seungbok, 1st daughter
  2. Wang Ji, Duke Changwon, 1st son
  3. Wang Wi, Marquess Siryeong (시령후 왕위), 2nd son
  4. Wang Jo, Duke Gyeongwon (경원공 왕조; d. 1279), 3rd son
  5. Wang Gyeong-ji (왕경지), 4th son – a monk.
  6. Wang Gak-eung (왕각응), 5th son – a monk.
  7. Princess Yeongchang (영창공주), 2nd daughter
  8. Princess Deokchang (덕창궁주), 3rd daughter
  9. Princess Gasun (가순궁주), 4th daughter
  10. Princess Jeonghui (정희궁주), 5th daughter

== Popular culture ==
- Portrayed by Jung Tae-woo in the 2003–2004 KBS TV series Age of Warriors.

== See also ==
- History of Korea
- List of Korean rulers
- List of Goryeo people

Huijong of Goryeo House of Wang Born: 21 June 1181 Died: 31 August 1237
Regnal titles
Preceded by Sinjong	King of Goryeo; 1204–1211	Succeeded by Gangjong
