= Gangjong of Goryeo =

King of Goryeo from 1211 to 1213

Gangjong

King of Goryeo
- Reign: 1212–1213
- Coronation: 1212
- Predecessor: Huijong of Goryeo
- Successor: Gojong of Goryeo
- Born: Wang Suk; 10 May 1152; Gaeseong-bu, Gaegyeong, Goryeo
- Died: 26 August 1213 (aged 61); Hwapyeong Hall, Suchang Palace, Gaegyeong, Goryeo
- Burial: Hureung (후릉; 厚陵)
- Spouse: Queen Sapyeong (m. 1174; dep. 1174) Queen Wondeok (m. 1175–1213)
- Issue: Sons: Gojong of Goryeo 9 other sons; Daughters: Princess Suryeong Princess Jeonghwa
Posthumous name
- Great King Juncheol Munyeol Danchong Myeongheon Yimo Mokcheong Wonhyo 준철문열단총명헌이모목청원효대왕 (濬哲文烈亶聰明憲貽謀穆淸元孝大王)
- House: Wang
- Dynasty: Goryeo
- Father: Myeongjong of Goryeo
- Mother: Queen Uijeong

Korean name
- Hangul: 왕오
- Hanja: 王祦
- RR: Wang O
- MR: Wang O

Monarch name
- Hangul: 강종
- Hanja: 康宗
- RR: Gangjong
- MR: Kangjong

Courtesy name
- Hangul: 대화, 법주
- Hanja: 大華, 法柱
- RR: Daehwa, Beopju
- MR: Taehwa, Pŏpchu

Posthumous name
- Hangul: 원효대왕
- Hanja: 元孝大王
- RR: Wonhyo daewang
- MR: Wŏnhyo taewang

Former names
- Hangul: 왕숙, 왕정
- Hanja: 王璹, 王貞
- RR: Wang Suk, Wang Jeong
- MR: Wang Suk, Wang Chŏng

Gangjong (Korean: 강종; Hanja: 康宗; 10 May 1152 – 26 August 1213), personal name Wang O (왕오; 王祦), was the 22nd ruler of the Korean Goryeo dynasty. He was the eldest son of King Myeongjong.

Gangjong was confirmed as heir in 1173. In 1197, he and his father were driven to Ganghwado by the military leader Ch'oe Ch'ung-hŏn. In 1210 Gangjong returned to the capital, and he was given a royal title by his uncle King Huijong in the following year. After Ch'oe drove Huijong from power that year, Gangjong was placed on the throne. Gangjong was essentially a puppet of General Ch'oe during his reign, and was succeeded by his son Gojong after ruling Goryeo for two years.

Gangjong's tomb is located outside the old Goryeo capital, in modern-day Hyŏnhwa-ri, Kaepung-gun, South Hwanghae Province, North Korea.

== Family ==
- Father: Myeongjong of Goryeo
  - Grandfather: Injong of Goryeo
  - Grandmother: Queen Gongye of the Jangheung Im clan
- Mother: Queen Uijeong of the Gangneung Kim clan
  - Grandfather: Wang On, Duke Gangneung
  - Grandmother: Lady, of the Gangneung Kim clan
- Consorts and their Respective issue(s):
1. Queen Sapyeong of the Jeonju Yi clan
  1. Princess Suryeong, 1st daughter
2. Queen Wondeok of the Kaeseong Wang clan; half fourth cousin once removed.
  1. Crown Prince Wang Cheol, 1st son
3. Unknown
  1. Princess Jeonghwa, 2nd daughter
  2. 9 sons, all were unknown.

== In popular culture ==
- Portrayed by Park Byung-sun and Lee-in in the 2003–2004 KBS TV series Age of Warriors.

== See also ==
- List of Korean monarchs
- Goryeo

Gangjong of Goryeo House of Wang Born: 10 May 1152 Died: 26 August 1213
Regnal titles
Preceded by Huijong	King of Goryeo; 1211–1213	Succeeded by Gojong
