= Sinjong of Goryeo =

King of Goryeo from 1197 to 1204

Sinjong 신종 神宗

King of Goryeo
- Reign: 1197–1204
- Coronation: 1197
- Predecessor: Myeongjong of Goryeo
- Successor: Huijong of Goryeo
- Regent: Ch'oe Ch'ung-hŏn (1197–1204)
- Born: Wang Min; 11 August 1144; Gaegyeong, Goryeo
- Died: 15 February 1204 (aged 59); Marquess Deokyang's Manor, Goryeo
- Burial: Yangneung (양릉; 陽陵)
- Queen Consort: Queen Seonjeong (before 1181)
- Issue: Huijong of Goryeo; Duke Yangyang; Princess Hyohoe; Princess Gyeongnyeong
Posthumous name
- Great King Gyeonggong Jeonghyo 경공정효대왕 (敬恭靖孝大王)
Temple name
- Sinjong (신종; 神宗)
- House: Wang
- Dynasty: Goryeo
- Father: Injong of Goryeo
- Mother: Queen Gongye

- Korean name
- Hangul: 왕탁
- Hanja: 王晫
- RR: Wang Tak
- MR: Wang T'ak

Monarch name
- Hangul: 신종
- Hanja: 神宗
- RR: Sinjong
- MR: Sinjong

Courtesy name
- Hangul: 지화
- Hanja: 至華
- RR: Jihwa
- MR: Chihwa

Posthumous name
- Hangul: 정효대왕
- Hanja: 靖孝大王
- RR: Jeonghyo daewang
- MR: Chŏnghyo taewang

Former name
- Hangul: 왕민
- Hanja: 王旼
- RR: Wang Min
- MR: Wang Min

Sinjong (11 August 1144 – 15 February 1204, r. 1197–1204), personal name Wang T'ak, was the twentieth monarch of the Goryeo dynasty of Korea. The fifth son of King Injong, King Sinjong took the throne after his brother King Myeongjong was sent into exile by Ch'oe Ch'ung-hŏn.

He was wise, but like his brother before him had no true power, which was in the hands of Ch'oe Ch'ung-hŏn (this marked the beginning of the Choe family's military rule). Sinjong's reign was marked by waves of civil uprisings, such as rebellions and uprisings in Myeongju, Jinju, Geumju, Hapcheon, Gyeongju, and Gwangju. Sinjong also witnessed the kin strife of the Choe family and soon after became ill, abdicating in favor of his son King Huijong due to Choe's demands.

== Family ==
- Father: Injong of Goryeo
  - Grandfather: Yejong of Goryeo
  - Grandmother: Queen Sundeok of the Gyeongwon Yi clan
- Mother: Queen Gongye of the Jangheung Im clan
  - Grandfather: Im Won-hu
  - Grandmother: Grand Lady, of Jinhan State of the Bupyeong Yi clan (진한국대부인 부평 이씨)
- Consorts and their Respective issue(s):
1. Queen Seonjeong of the Gangneung Kim clan, half second cousin once removed.
  1. Crown Prince Wang Yeong, 1st son
  2. Princess Hyohoe, 1st daughter
  3. Wang Seo, Duke Yangyang, 2nd son
  4. Princess Gyeongnyeong, 2nd daughter

== Popular culture ==
- Portrayed by Lee Woo-seok in the 2003–2004 KBS TV series Age of Warriors.

== See also ==
- History of Korea
- List of Korean monarchs

Sinjong of Goryeo House of Wang Born: 11 August 1144 Died: 15 February 1204
Regnal titles
Preceded by Myeongjong	King of Goryeo; 1197–1204	Succeeded by Huijong
