= Myeongjong of Goryeo =

King of Goryeo from 1170 to 1197

Myeongjong 명종 明宗

King of Goryeo
- Reign: 1170–1197
- Coronation: 1170
- Predecessor: Uijong of Goryeo
- Successor: Sinjong of Goryeo
- Regent: Yi Ŭi-bang (1170–1174); Chŏng Chung-bu (1174–1179); Kyŏng Tae-sŭng (1179–1183); Yi Ŭi-min (1183–1196); Ch'oe Ch'ung-hŏn (1196–1197)
- Born: Wang Hŭn; 8 November 1131; Yeondeok Palace?, Gaegyeong, Goryeo
- Died: 3 December 1202 (aged 71); Disputed between: Changrak Palace or Yanghwa Palace, Gaegyeong, Goryeo
- Burial: Jireung (지릉; 智陵)
- Spouse: Queen Uijeong (before 1152)
- Concubine: Lady Myeongchun; Lady Sunju
- Issue: Sons: Gangjong of Goryeo Wang Sŏn-sa Wang Hong-gi Wang Hong-chu Wang Hong-gyu Wang Hong-gyun Wang Hong-gak Wang Hong-i; Daughters: Princess Yeonhui Princess Suan A daughter
Posthumous name
- Great King Hwangmyeong Gwanghyo 황명광효대왕 (皇明光孝大王)
Temple name
- Myeongjong (명종; 明宗)
- House: Wang
- Dynasty: Goryeo
- Father: Injong of Goryeo
- Mother: Queen Gongye

- Korean name
- Hangul: 왕호
- Hanja: 王晧
- RR: Wang Ho
- MR: Wang Ho

Monarch name
- Hangul: 명종
- Hanja: 明宗
- RR: Myeongjong
- MR: Myŏngjong

Courtesy name
- Hangul: 지단
- Hanja: 之旦
- RR: Jidan
- MR: Chidan

Posthumous name
- Hangul: 광효대왕
- Hanja: 光孝大王
- RR: Gwanghyo daewang
- MR: Kwanghyo taewang

Former name
- Hangul: 왕흔
- Hanja: 王昕
- RR: Wang Heun
- MR: Wang Hŭn

Myeongjong (8 November 1131 – 3 December 1202), personal name Wang Ho, was the 19th king of Korea's Goryeo dynasty. He was the third son of King Injong. His reign marked the beginning of the century-long military rule of Korea known as the Goryeo military regime.

Although it was intended that King Injong's second son should succeed his father, he was assassinated because Chŏng Chung-bu feared that he might become a threat to him in the future. Myeongjong was a weak puppet king, and was merely on the throne to show the general populace they still had a king, as the true rulers were the military leaders who had launched a coup d'état against Myeongjong's older brother and had established a military government. Despite this, Myeongjong did attempt to play off the military leaders against each other to both secure his own survival but also in an attempt to regain royal authority. His reign saw constant bloodshed as well as the deaths of the military rulers Chŏng Chung-bu, Yi Ŭi-bang, Kyŏng Tae-sŭng, and Yi Ŭi-min.

After twenty-seven years on the throne, he was sent into exile by the military ruler of the time, Ch'oe Ch'ung-hŏn. King Injong's fifth son, King Sinjong, was placed on the throne.

== Family ==
- Father: Injong of Goryeo
  - Grandfather: Yejong of Goryeo
  - Grandmother: Queen Sundeok of the Gyeongwon Yi clan
- Mother: Queen Gongye of the Jangheung Im clan
  - Grandfather: Im Won-hu
  - Grandmother: Grand Lady, of Jinhan State of the Bupyeong Yi clan (진한국대부인 부평 이씨)
- Consort and their Respective issue(s):
1. Queen Uijeong of the Gangneung Kim clan, half second cousin once removed.
  1. Crown Prince Wang Yeong, 1st son
  2. Princess Yeonhui, 1st daughter
  3. Princess Suan, 2nd daughter
2. Concubine Myeongchun (명춘; d. 1180) – No issue.
3. Concubine Sunju (순주; d. 1179) – No issue.
4. Unknown
  1. Wang Seon-sa (왕선사), 2nd son
  2. Wang Hong-gi (왕홍기), 3rd son
  3. Wang Hong-chu (왕홍추), 4th son
  4. Wang Hong-gyu (왕홍규), 5th son
  5. Wang Hong-gyun (왕홍균), 6th son
  6. Wang Hong-gak (왕홍각), 7th son
  7. Wang Hong-yi (왕홍이), 8th son

== Popular culture ==
- Portrayed by Kim Byung-se in the 2003–2004 KBS TV series Age of Warriors.

== See also ==
- History of Korea
- List of Korean monarchs

Preceded by Uijong	King of Goryeo; 1170–1197	Succeeded by Sinjong
