= GGU =

GGU may refer to:

== Education ==
- Godavari Global University, in Rajahmundry, Andhra Pradesh, India
- Gokul Global University, in Gujarat, India
- Golden Gate University, in San Francisco, California, United States
- Guru Ghasidas Vishwavidyalaya, in Chhattisgarh, India
- Geumgang University, in Nonsan, South Korea

== Other uses ==
- Gban language
- Geological Survey of Greenland
- GGU, a codon for the amino acid glycine
- Good Game University, now Team Coast, an eSports team
