= Samgwangsa =

Temple in Busan, South Korea

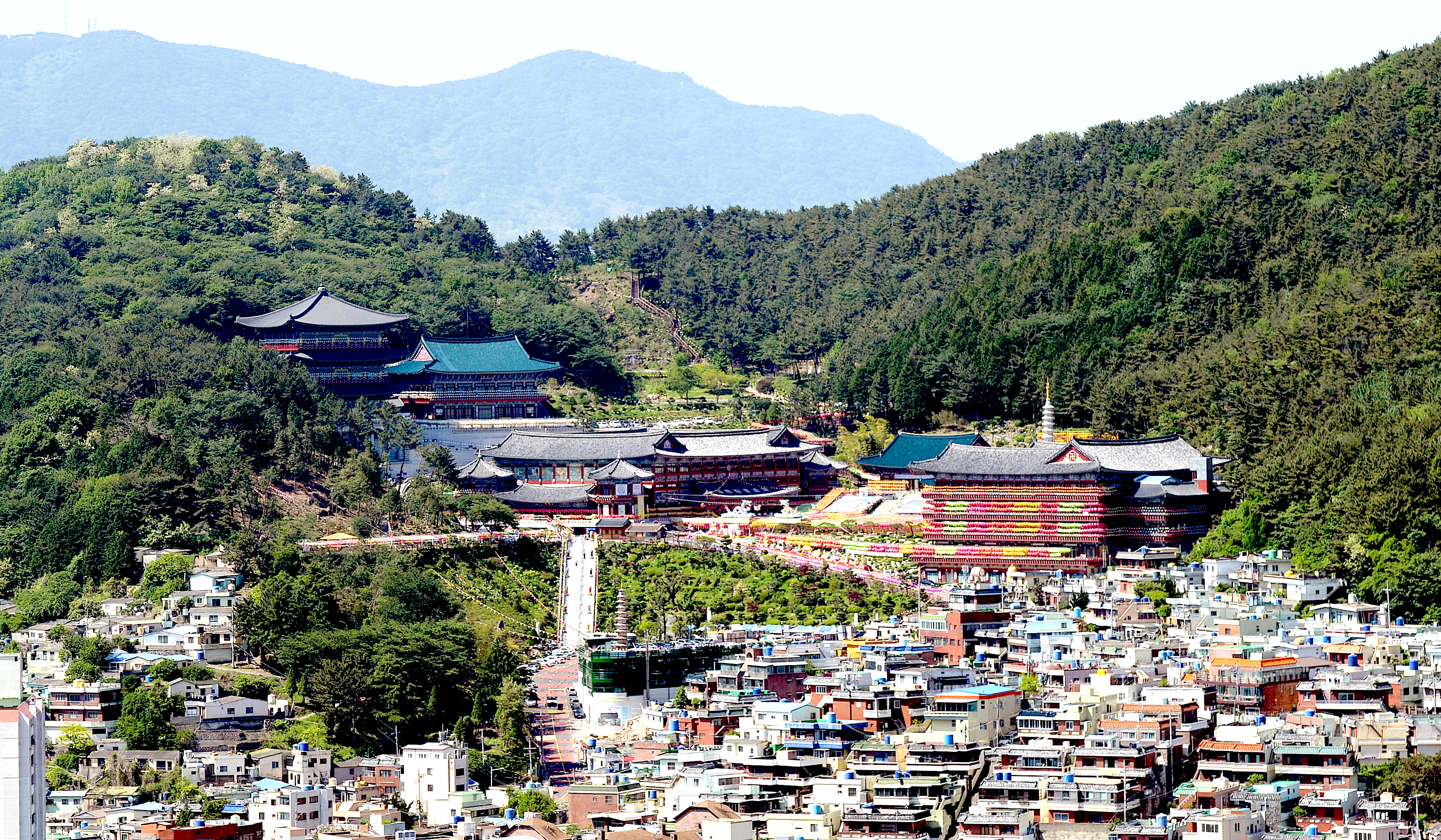
- Samgwangsa Temple, founded at the foot of Baekyangsan Mountain

- Location within South Korea

Religion
- Affiliation: Buddhism

Location
- Country: South Korea
- Coordinates: 35.174761°N 129.043669°E

Korean name
- Hangul: 삼광사
- Hanja: 三光寺
- RR: Samgwangsa
- MR: Samgwangsa

Samgwangsa Temple (Korean: 삼광사) is the second temple of the Korean Buddhist Cheontae Order, located in Choeup-dong, Busanjin District, Busan, South Korea.

Jigwanjeon is a Buddhist community center featuring a multipurpose hall that can accommodate approximately 10,000 visitors at a time. CNN has selected this place as one of the 50 most beautiful must-see spots in South Korea.

== Background of the construction ==
On October 27, 1970, great patriarch Sangwol Wongak attended a Buddhist service at the Busan Education Hall in Choryang-dong, Dong-gu, Busan Metropolitan City. In front of an audience of about 1,000 devotees, he requested that a Buddhist hall and a grand temple capable of accommodating about 10,000 people at once be built in the port city of Busan.

In 1986, the temple, newly constructed in Choeup-dong, Busanjin-gu, Busan Metropolitan City, was named Samgwangsa by the great master Nam Dae-chung.

== Features ==
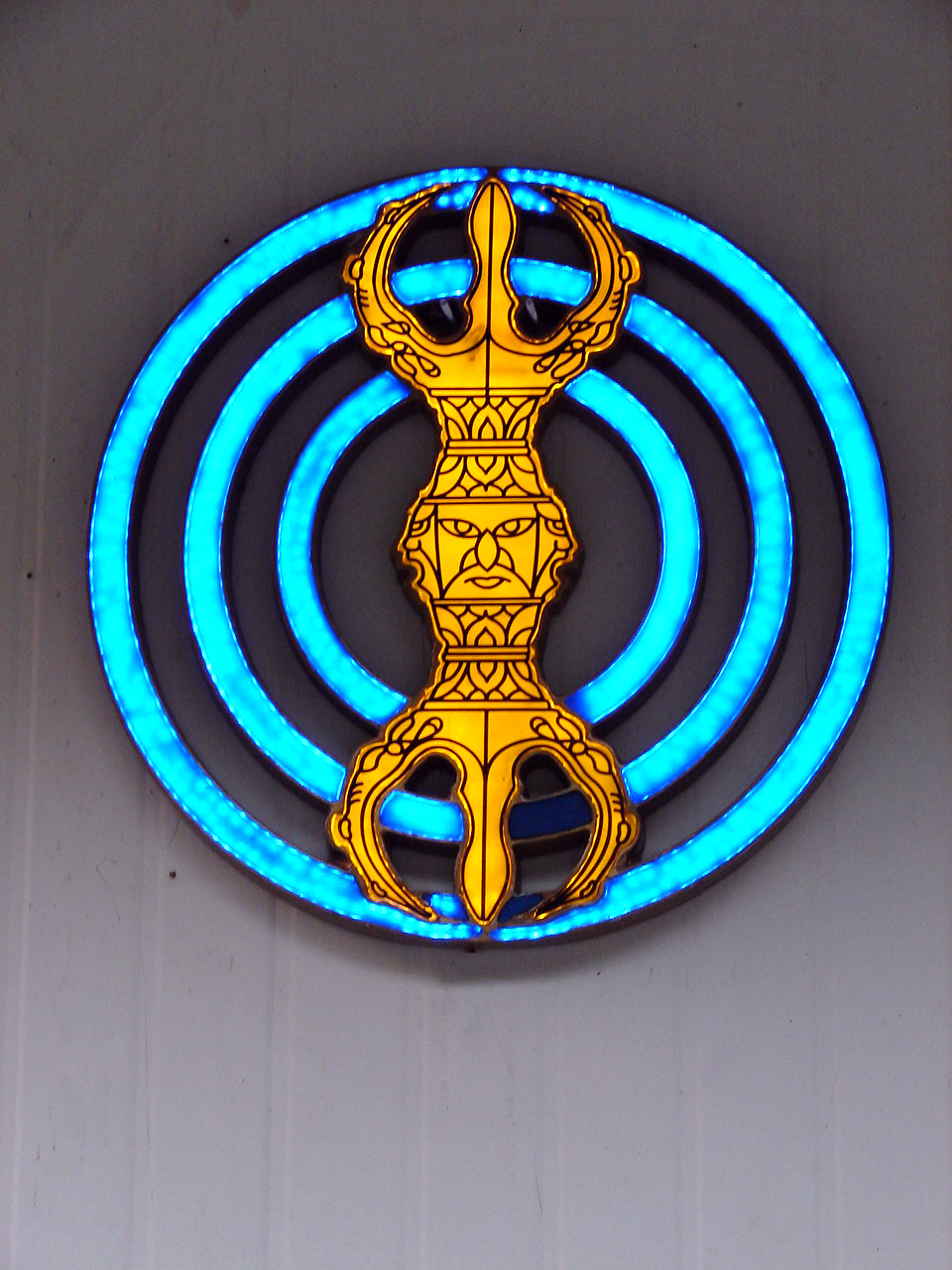
Cheontae Sect Logo

=== Founding of a temple with a multi-story quarters building for the monks ===
Beopha Sammaedang
- 법화삼매당
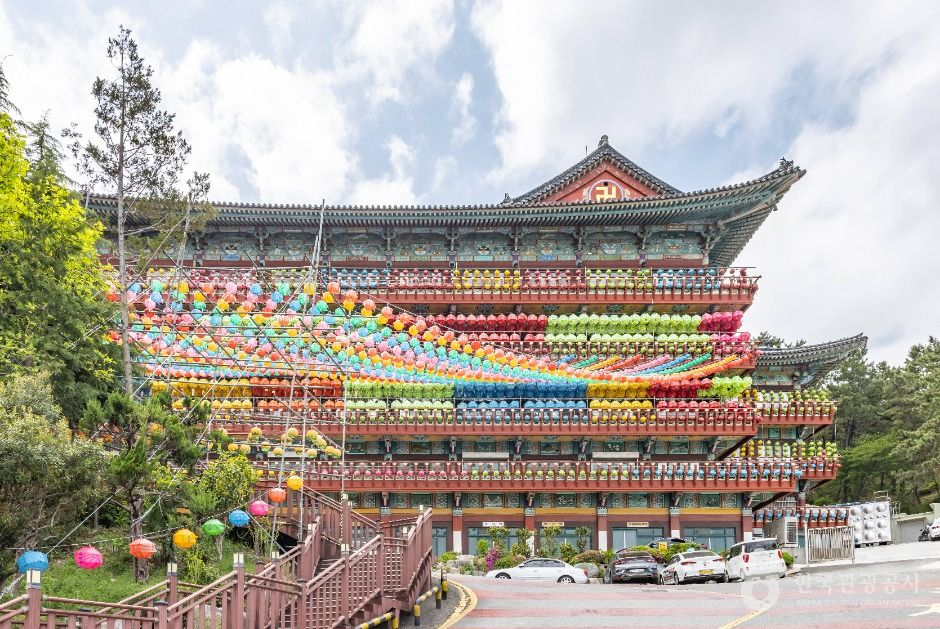

Religion
- Affiliation: Cheontae

Location
- Location: Busan, South Korea
- State: Sangha residence

Architecture
- Style: structure type with simple bracket set, tapered column, protruding railing
- Groundbreaking: 1985
- Completed: 1987

Specifications
- Width: approximately 1,700 pyeong
- Height (max): 5-story
- Materials: reinforced concrete

Samgwangsa Temple is a massive Buddhist complex situated on a site of approximately 115,500 m^{2} (about 35,000 pyeong), with a total floor area of approximately 16,500 m^{2} (5,000 pyeong). It features the Daeungbojeon, measuring about 330 m^{2} (about 100 pyeong), and the Jigwanjeon, a multipurpose Buddhist hall with a total floor area of approximately 9,900 m^{2} (3,000 pyeong), which can accommodate over 10,000 people simultaneously for grand Buddhist ceremonies and various cultural and artistic events. Jigwanjeon is a five-story building in the traditional Korean style, constructed of reinforced concrete and featuring a hip-and-gable roof.

The Beopha Sammaedang is a five-story, traditional Korean-style building constructed of reinforced concrete and is the largest monks’ quarters (寮舍齋) of its kind.

=== The largest stone pagoda in East Asia ===
The Great Treasure Pagoda of 53 Buddhas, 8-Sided and 9-Story, is the largest stone pagoda in East Asia and houses 10 Buddha relics donated by Tibet, Myanmar, and India.

This is a nine-story, eight-sided Great Pagoda housing 53 Buddha statues, built to pray for world peace and reunification of North and South Korea.

== Gallery ==
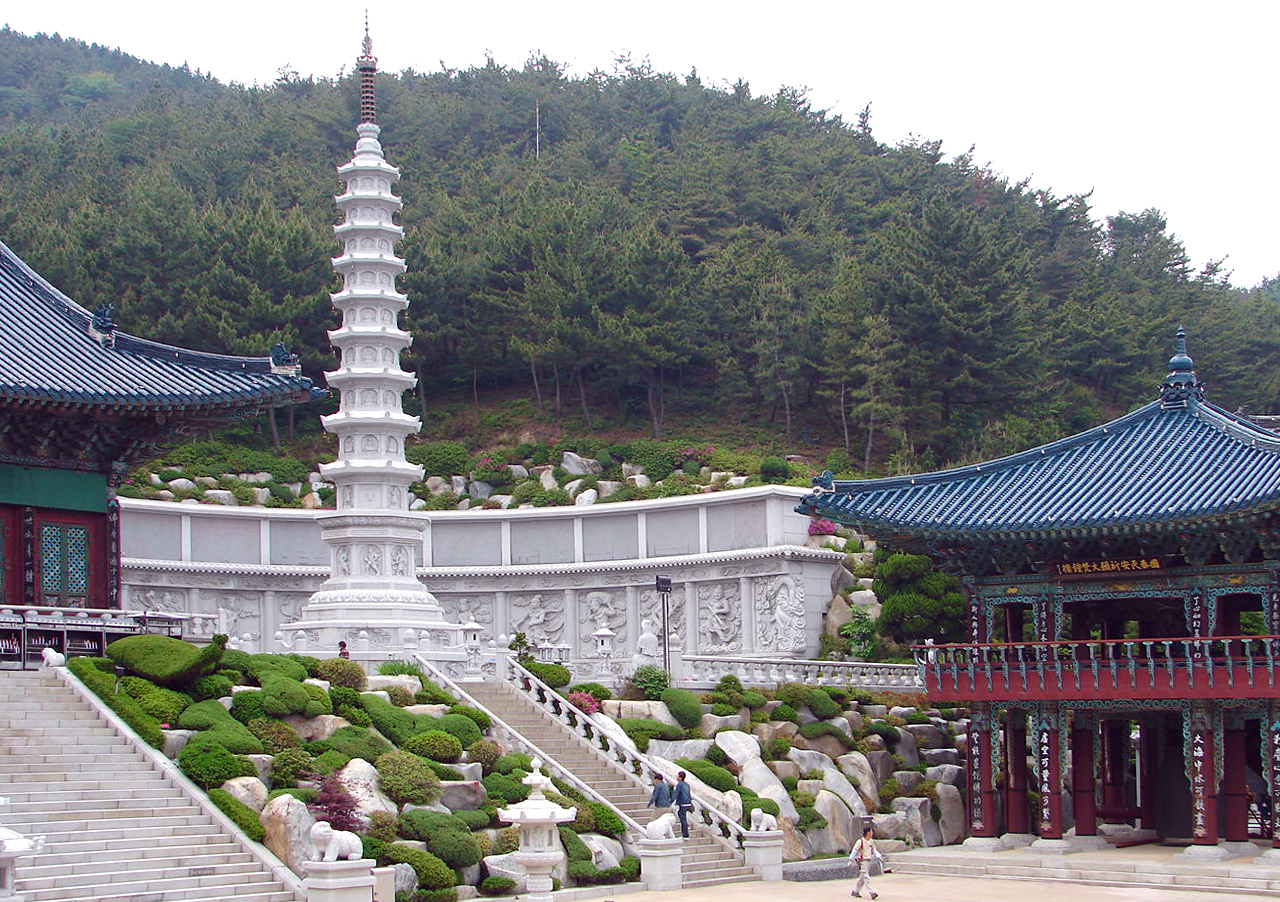
Daebotap, the Great Treasure Pagoda of 8-side and 9-story with 53-Buddha carvings

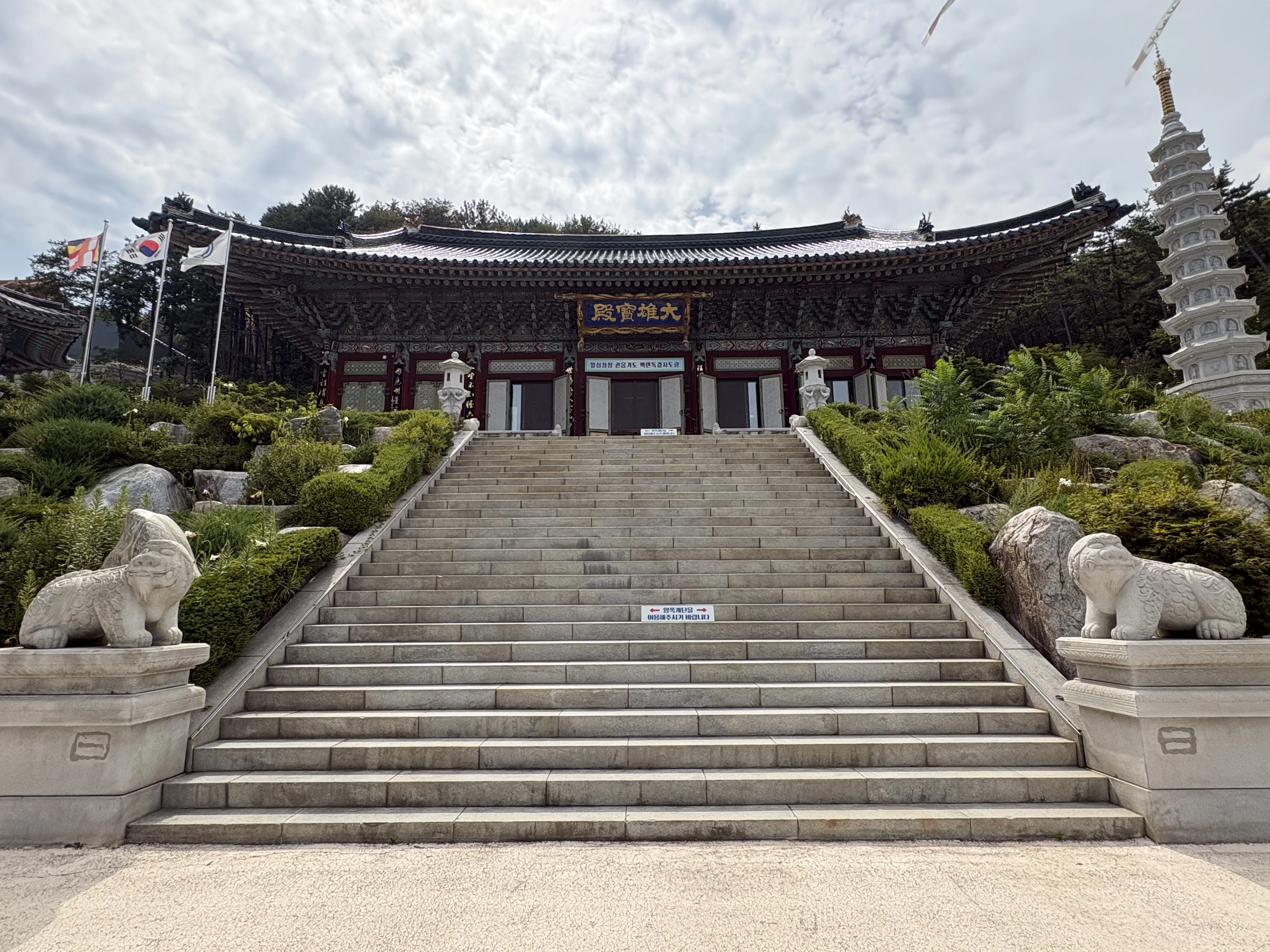
Daewoongbojeon (The Main Hall)

Jigwanjeon, The Hall of Samadha Vipassana

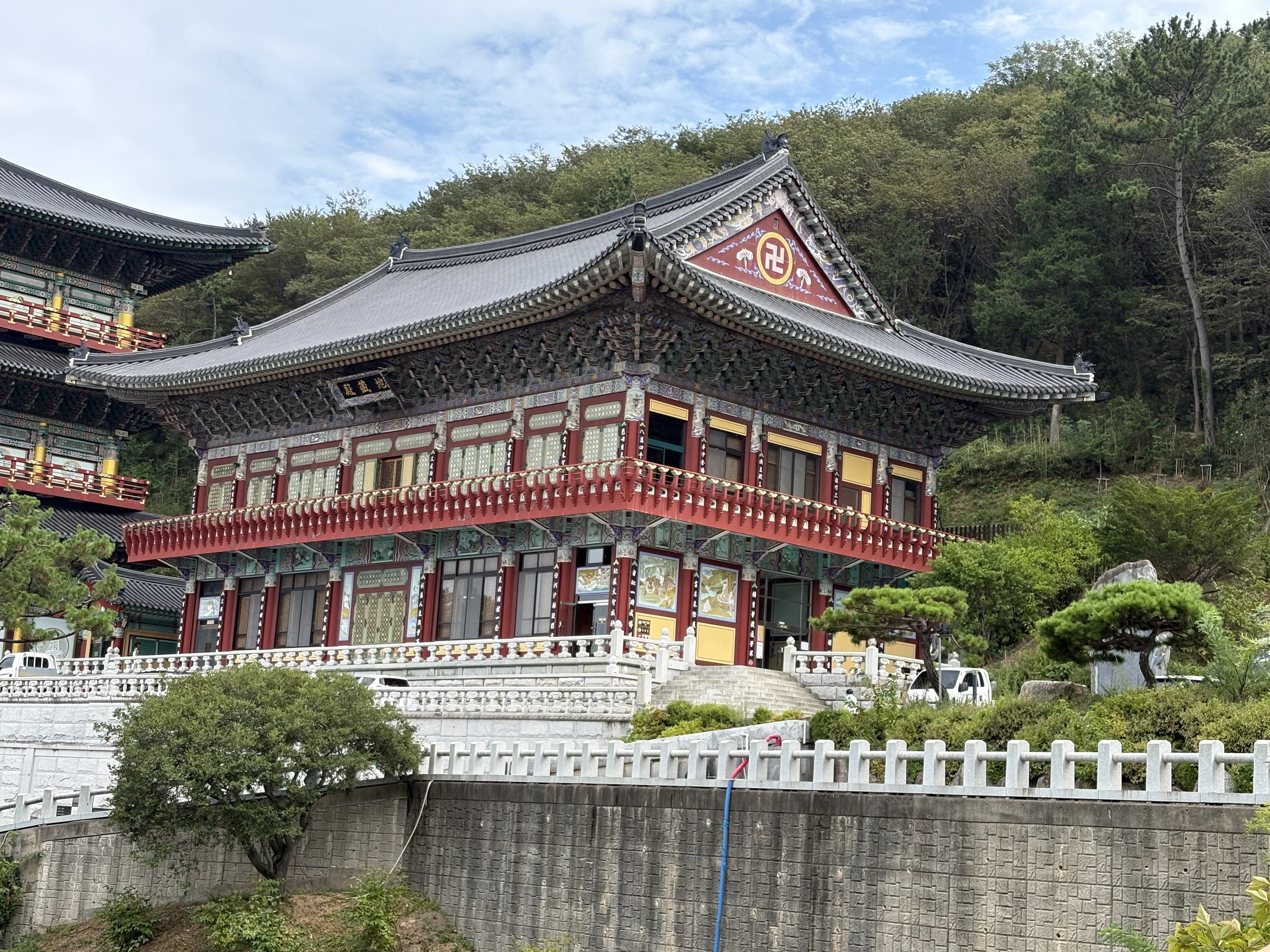
Jijangjeon

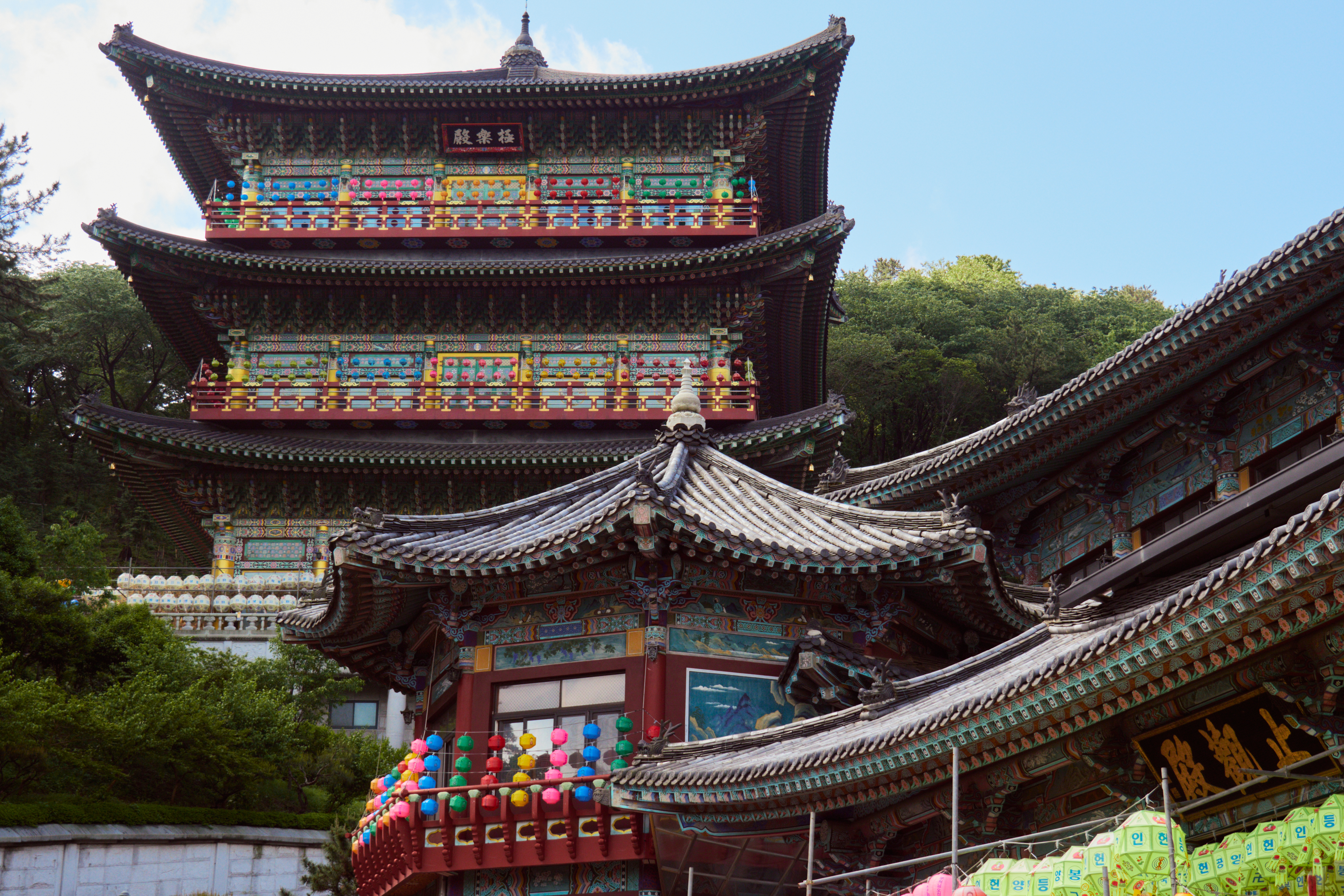
The multi-storied main pagoda of Samgwangsa temple, Geungnakjeon

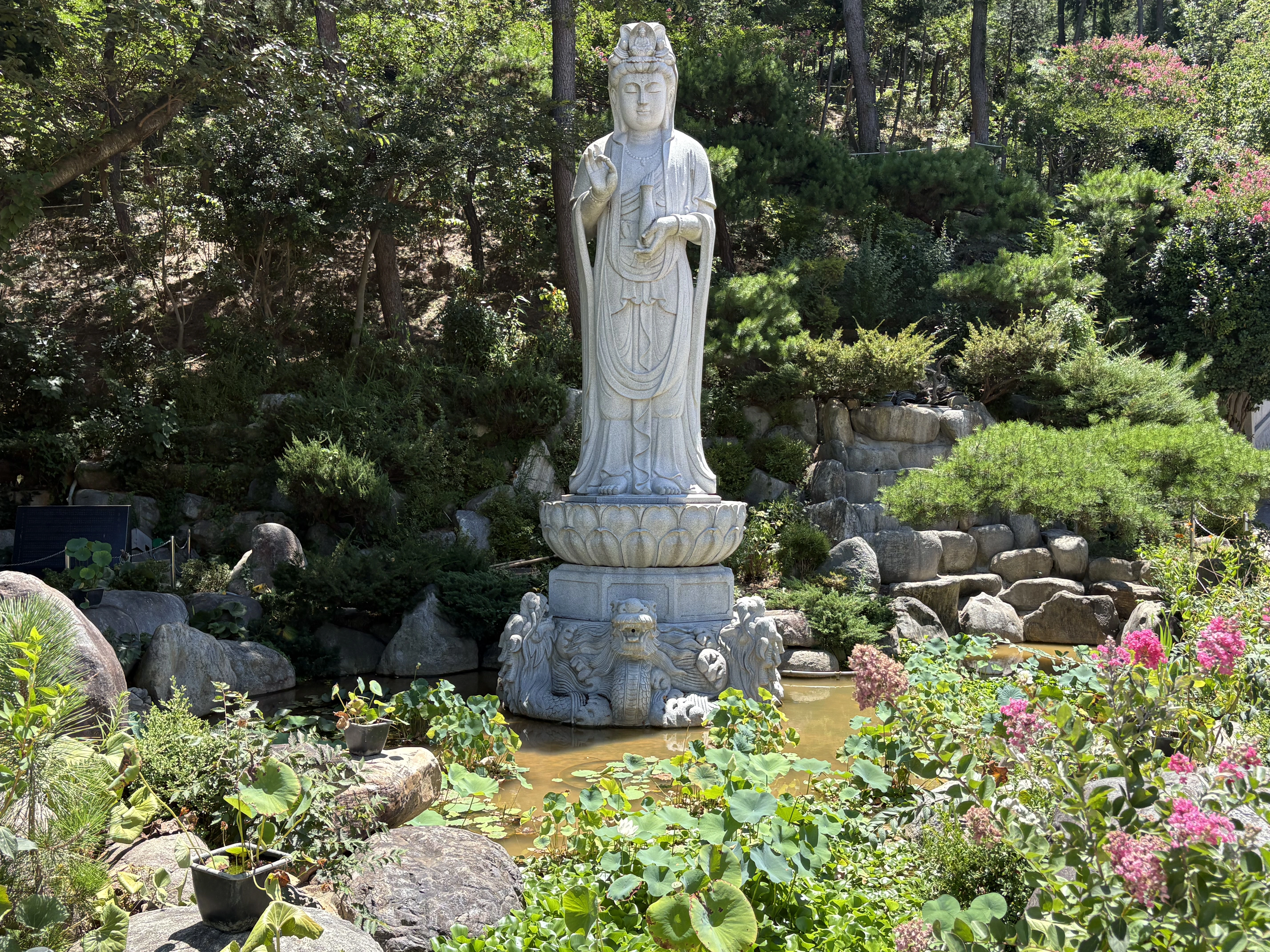
Avalokitesvara Bodhisattva Statue of Sea

Beomjongkak (The Pavilion of Buddhist Bell)

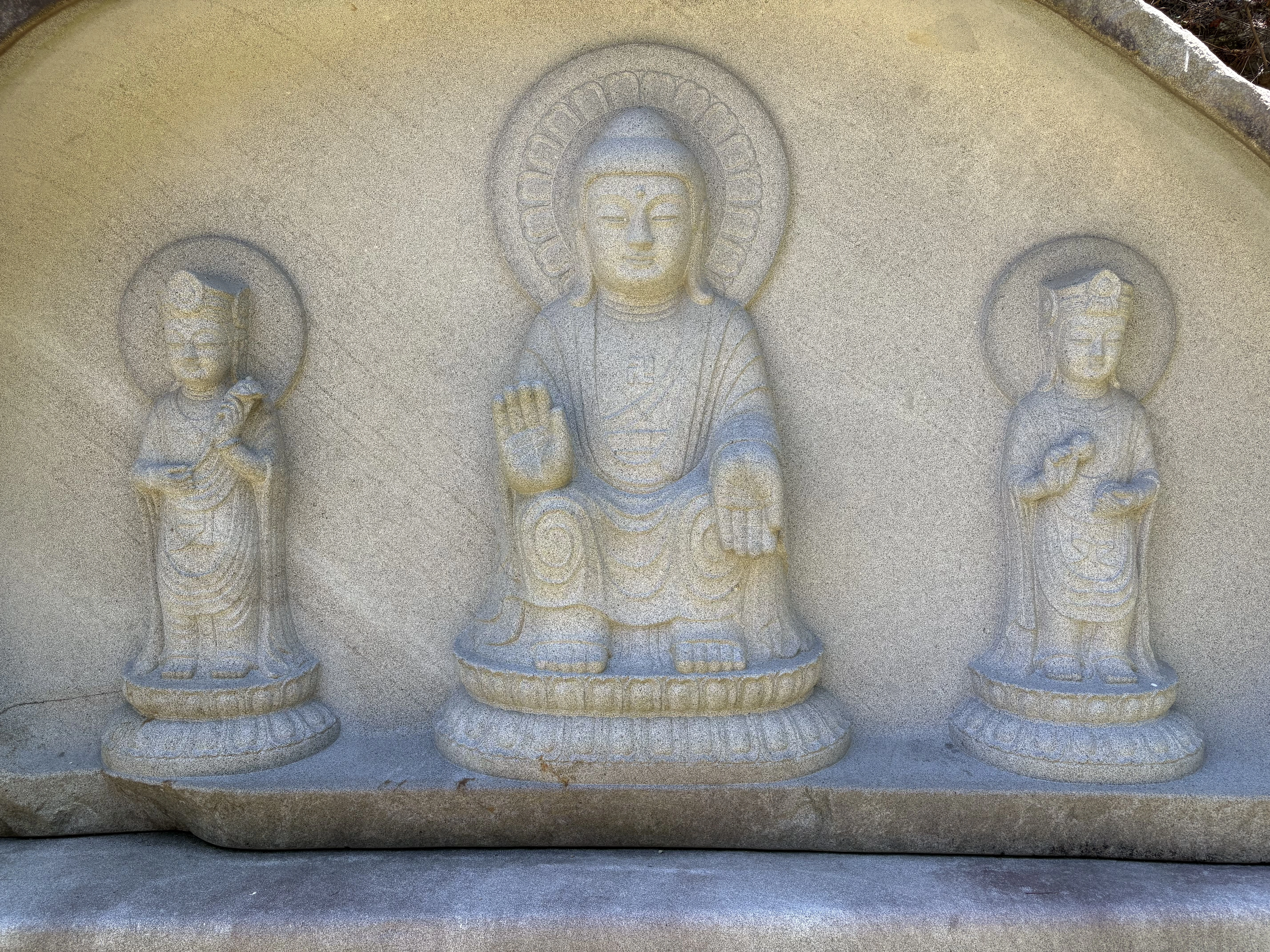
Samgwangsa Stone Maitreya Buddha Triad Replica

== See also ==
- Guinsa
- Geumgang University
