= Ryongtongsa =

Buddhist temple in Kaesong, North Korea

Coordinates: 38°2′31″N 126°34′37″E

- Hangul: 령통사
- Hanja: 靈通寺
- RR: Ryeongtongsa
- MR: Ryŏngt'ongsa

Ryongtongsa is a Korean Buddhist temple located on Ogwansan in Kaesong, North Korea.

== History ==
Founded by the Cheontae sect of Buddhism in 1027, the temple is believed to be one of the first of the sect's temples in Korea. Destroyed by a fire in the 16th century, and further damaged by American bombing during the Korean War, little remained of the original temple when reconstruction began in 2000 as a joint Korean cultural project. After five years of work, the restoration was completed on October 31, 2005. The temple contains the ashes of Uicheon, the sect's founder. A son of Emperor Munjong of Goryeo, he spent most of his life in Kaesong before retiring to the temple as an ascetic, where he lived until his death. The temple was thus closely connected with the royal family of Goryeo and was where they would attend services.

== Architecture ==
The main temple is divided into two sections: a west court and an east court. The main entrance to the temple is through the South Gate, in front of which are located the temple's original stone banner pillars. Through the gate is an unwalled plaza containing a monument to Uicheon. Erected in 1125, the much-worn stele rests on the back of a lion-turtle, and commemorates episodes from the life of the great monk. It is listed as National Treasure #155. From here, both the Middle and East Gates are accessible. The Middle Gate, directly across from the South Gate, leads to the temple's large West Court, which is dominated by Bogwang Hall (普光院, "Hall of Universal Light"), the temple's main shrine. To the right, the East Gate leads to the smaller courtyard fronting Bojo Hall (普炤院, "Hall of Universal Clarity"), devoted to veneration of the Bodhisattvas.

In front of Bogwang Hall there are three pagodas, two three-storied, and one five-storied. The smaller three-storied pagoda measures 4.1 meters, while the larger measures 4.4. The five storied pagoda is 5.5 meters. The pagodas are plainly carved in sandstone, with upturned eaves surmounting square segments decorated only with raised vertical lines on the corners. All three date to the Koryo dynasty. The pagodas are registered as National Treasure #133.

Directly behind Pogwang Hall is Junggak Hall (重閣院), a meditation room and lecture hall decorated with paintings of important Buddhist monks. Behind this there are two gates to the back courtyard of the temple, where Sungbok Hall (崇福院) is located. This building once held the living quarters for the temple's monks.

Behind the main temple and up the mountain is Gyeongseon Hall (敬先院), containing a shrine to Uicheon; The stone stupa in front of the hall contains his ashes.

The roofs of the main buildings are decorated with ceramic ornaments in the shapes of fish (known as wenshou in Chinese). These are believed to keep the buildings safe from evil and fire.

Altogether, the reconstructed temple consists of over 26 buildings in an area of over 4,000 square meters.

== See also ==
- Cheontae
- Uicheon
- Guinsa
- Korean Buddhism
- National Treasures of North Korea
- Korean architecture
