= Guinsa =

Temple in North Chungcheong, South Korea

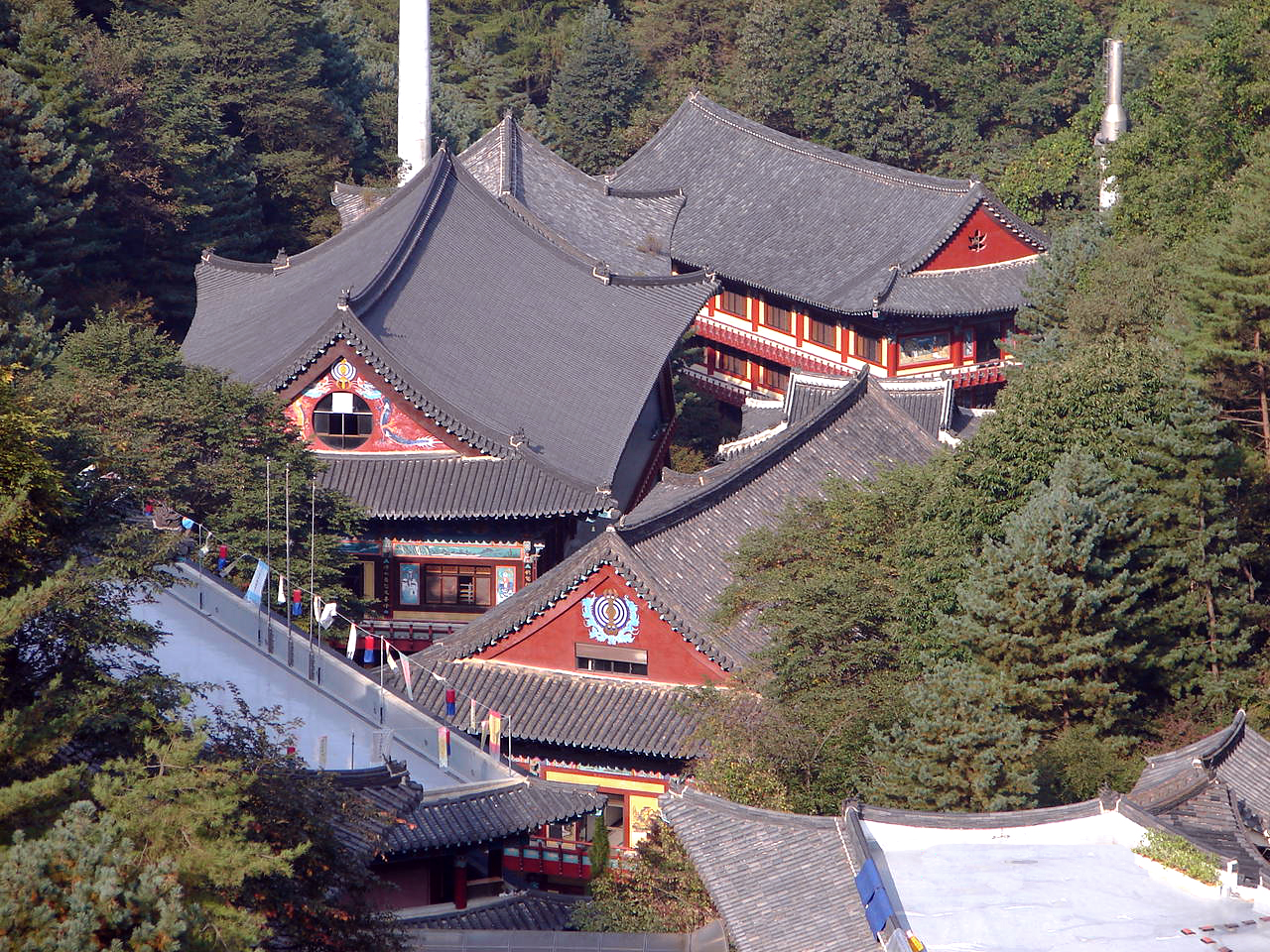
- Guinsa nestled into the valley in the Sobaek Mountains

- Location within South Korea

Religion
- Affiliation: Buddhism

Location
- Country: South Korea
- Coordinates: 37.031002°N 128.479915°E

Korean name
- Hangul: 구인사
- Hanja: 救仁寺
- RR: Guinsa
- MR: Kuinsa

Guinsa (Korean: 구인사; lit. 'Temple of Salvation and Kindness'), in the Yeonhwa area of the Sobaek Mountains located near Danyang in Chungcheongbuk-do, South Korea, is the headquarters of the Cheontae school of Korean Buddhism. Guinsa is the administrative center of over 140 sub-temples and hermitages of the Cheontae sect.

Although the architecture of Guinsa follows that of many other Buddhist temples in Korea, it is also markedly different in that the structures are several stories tall, instead of the typical one or two stories that structures in many other Korean temples have. This may be due to the restraints of the valley in which it is located and to modern construction techniques, but it creates a visual experience that is both beautiful and unique from what one sees at other temples.

Up to 10,000 monks can live here at any one point while the kitchen can serve food for twice that number when needed. The temple maintains and operates a large farm system covering over 60,000 pyeong/0.198 km^{2}/0.0765 sq MI and provides much of the food prepared and consumed at the temple. As with many Korean temples, free simple vegetarian meals are served for all visitors in Guinsa at setting time (about 6:30-7:00 for breakfast, 11:30-13:30 for lunch, 18:30 for dinner), no matter your race or religion. But as Buddhism believing everything people enjoy now comes from karma of their past acts and thoughts, they have to finish their meals, whatever they have taken.

The ubiquitous black slate roof tiles found commonly on Korean temples is occasionally replaced by orange glazed tiles reminding one of those seen on the roofs of Beijing's Forbidden City. Some buildings resemble the Potala Palace in Lhasa with their use of height and vertical lines.

Guinsa operates Geumgang University between Nonsan and Daejeon.

The 2 days Temple Stay Program, twice a month, includes getting up at 3am for the morning ceremony, can be booked via internet or phone.

== History ==
Unlike many of Korea's temples, Guinsa is fairly new, dating only back to 1945. The temple is strikingly located, squeezed into a narrow valley surrounded on all sides by mountains, and its location was decreed by head monk Sangwol Wongak's (上月圓覺) interpretation of the Lotus Sutra.

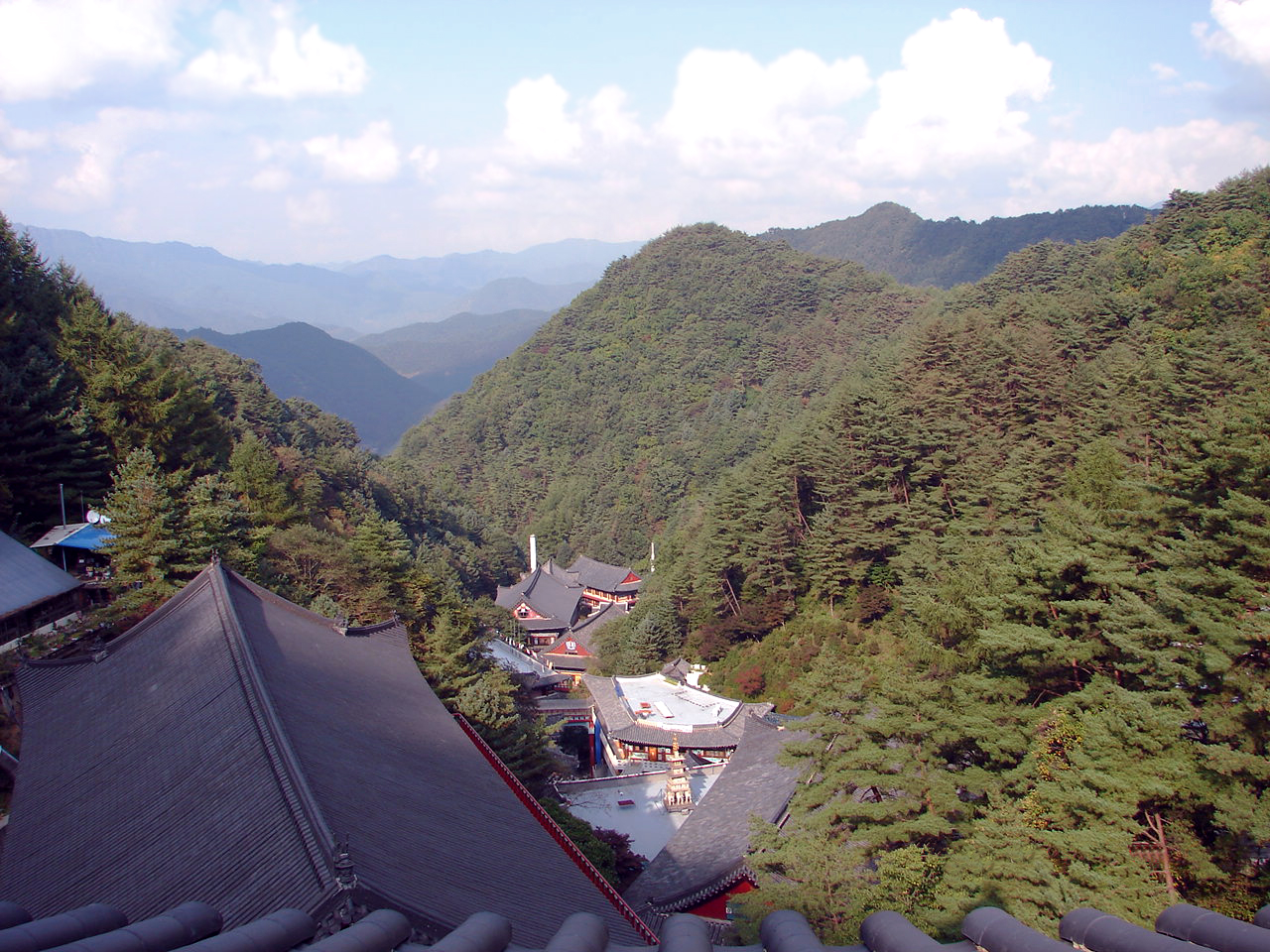
Guinsa halls fill the valley below

The original temple was burned down during the Korean War, but the reconstruction of the first building was completed in 1966 and the complex, which now incorporates over 50 buildings, is still expanding.

In 1967 the Cheontae school is reestablished at Guinsa and registered with the Korean government as the Cheontae Order. Master Sangwol assumes his position as the First Patriarch of the Order.

The 5-Story Dharma Law Hall (5층 대법당 Ocheung Daebeoptang) is completed and becomes the largest building of its kind on Korea.

1982 brings the establishment Geumgang Buddhist College at the Geumgang Institute.

=== Early history ===
Early history leading to the establishment of Guinsa:

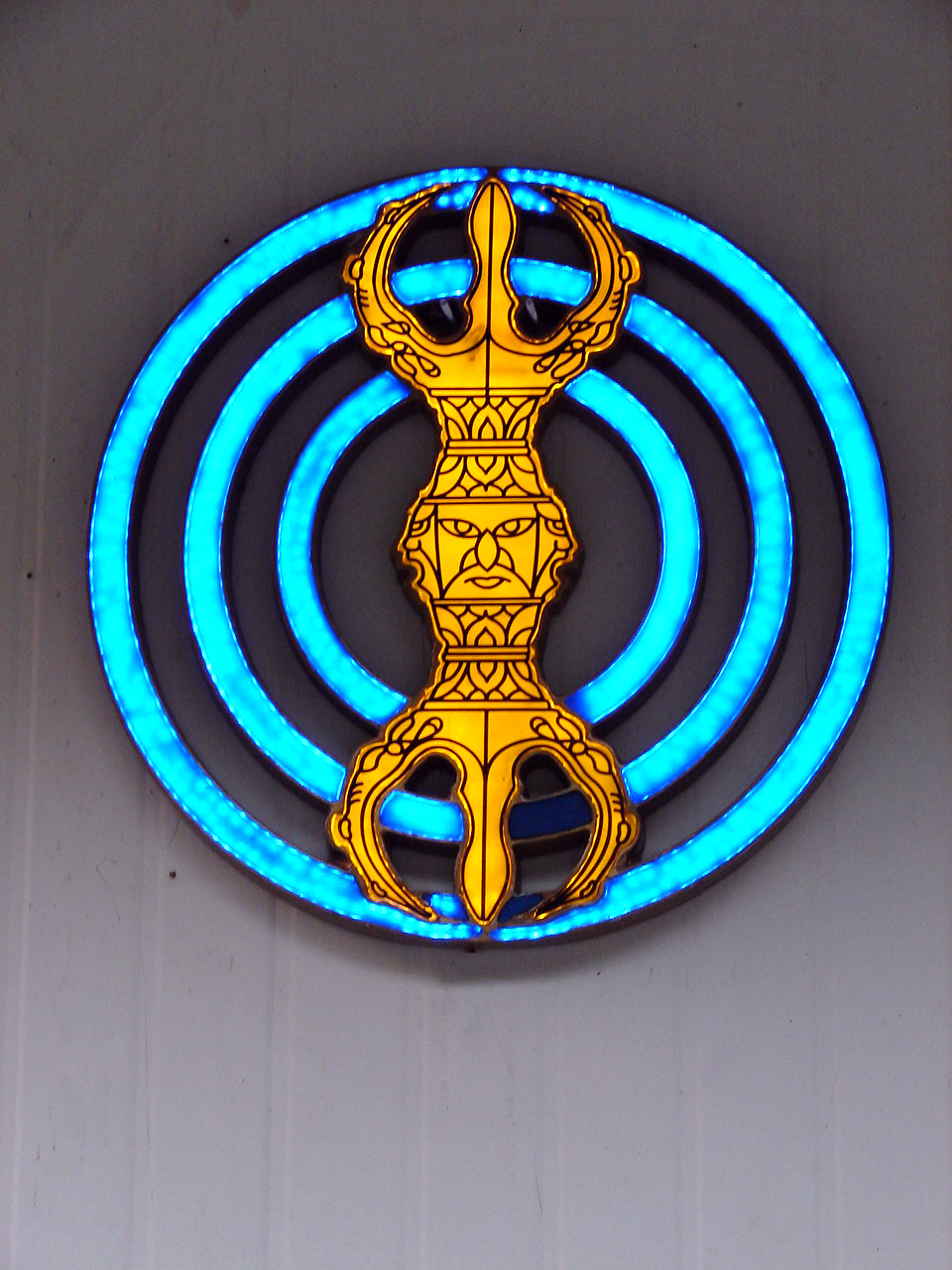
Cheontae Sect Logo

- 594 AD - The Chinese Sui dynasty master Zhiyi completes the Three-part Lotus Sutra and establishes the Cheontae school.
- 581~597 AD - Master Yeongwang of the Silla dynasty studies the "Sublime Contemplation of the Lotus" under Master Zhiyi in China later returning to Silla to teach the Cheontae Doctrine.
- 730 AD - Silla monks Peopyung, Ieung and Sunyeong study the Cheontae teaching under Grand Master Chwagye Hyeonrang and return to Korea to transmit the Cheontae doctrine.
- 1097 AD - The Cheontae school of Korea is founded by National Master Daegak Guksa at Gukcheonsa (temple).
- 1424 AD - The Cheontae school is consolidated into the Zen (Seon) school as part of the Yi dynasty's anti- Buddhist policy. This resulted in the Cheontae teachings being merged with folk Buddhism.
- 1855 AD - Layman Weolchang Kim Taehyeon writes "Seonhak Lumun (Gateway to Zen)", an exposition of Cheontae meditation practices, to help preserve the Cheontae traditions.

== Structures ==
Notable structures include:

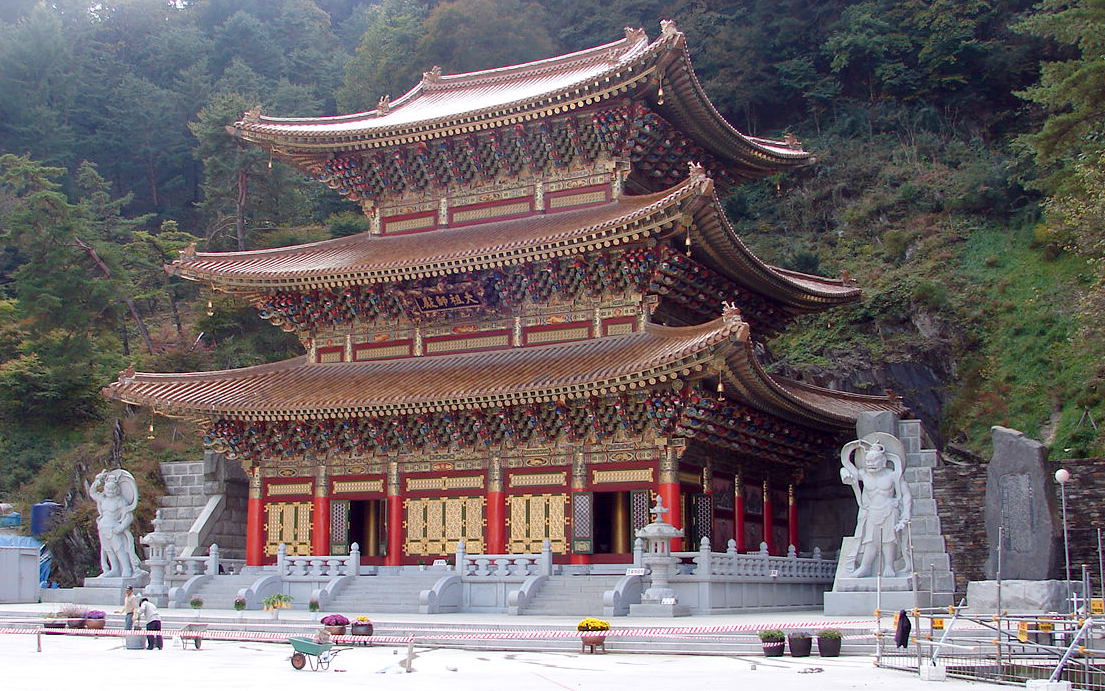
Daejosajeon (대조사전) or Great Teacher Hall near the top of the valley.

- The Great Teacher Hall (대조사전 Daejosajeon), a shrine erected in the memory of Sangwol Wongak, a large statue of whom can be found inside.
- The Four Heavenly Kings Gate (사천왕문 Sacheonwangmun) is a two-story stone structure, containing statues of the Four Heavenly Kings, marking the start of the temple complex.
- The 5-Story Dharma Law Hall (5층대법당 Ocheung Daebeoptang), also referred to as the 5-story Grand Dharma Hall, completed in 1980 is reputedly one of the largest temple buildings in Korea, and like so many of the other buildings on the temple complex, is elaborate in both terms of painting and structural design. The first and second floors contain meditation halls for the monks. The third and fourth floors have shrine rooms for devotees wishing to offer prayer. The fifth floor contains the huge Dharma Hall housing a large gilded altar of the main Buddha Shakyamuni, Supreme Budda of the present, flanked by his attendants. On the left sits Avalokitesvara, Bodhisattva of Compassion, and on the right sits Mahasthamaprapta, Bodhisattva of wisdom. A unique Thangka behind the Buddhas is a painted raised wood carving.
- The Cafeteria Hall (향적당 Hyangjeokdang) contains the huge kitchen and large temple cafeteria.
- The Three Story Stone Pagoda (Samcheung Seoktap), located in front of the main sanctuary is a reliquary housing the sarira of the Buddha brought back from the monastery of the Jetavana in India. Three elephants support the base of the pagoda and these strong, intelligent animals symbolize the Buddha's Dharma.

== Gallery ==
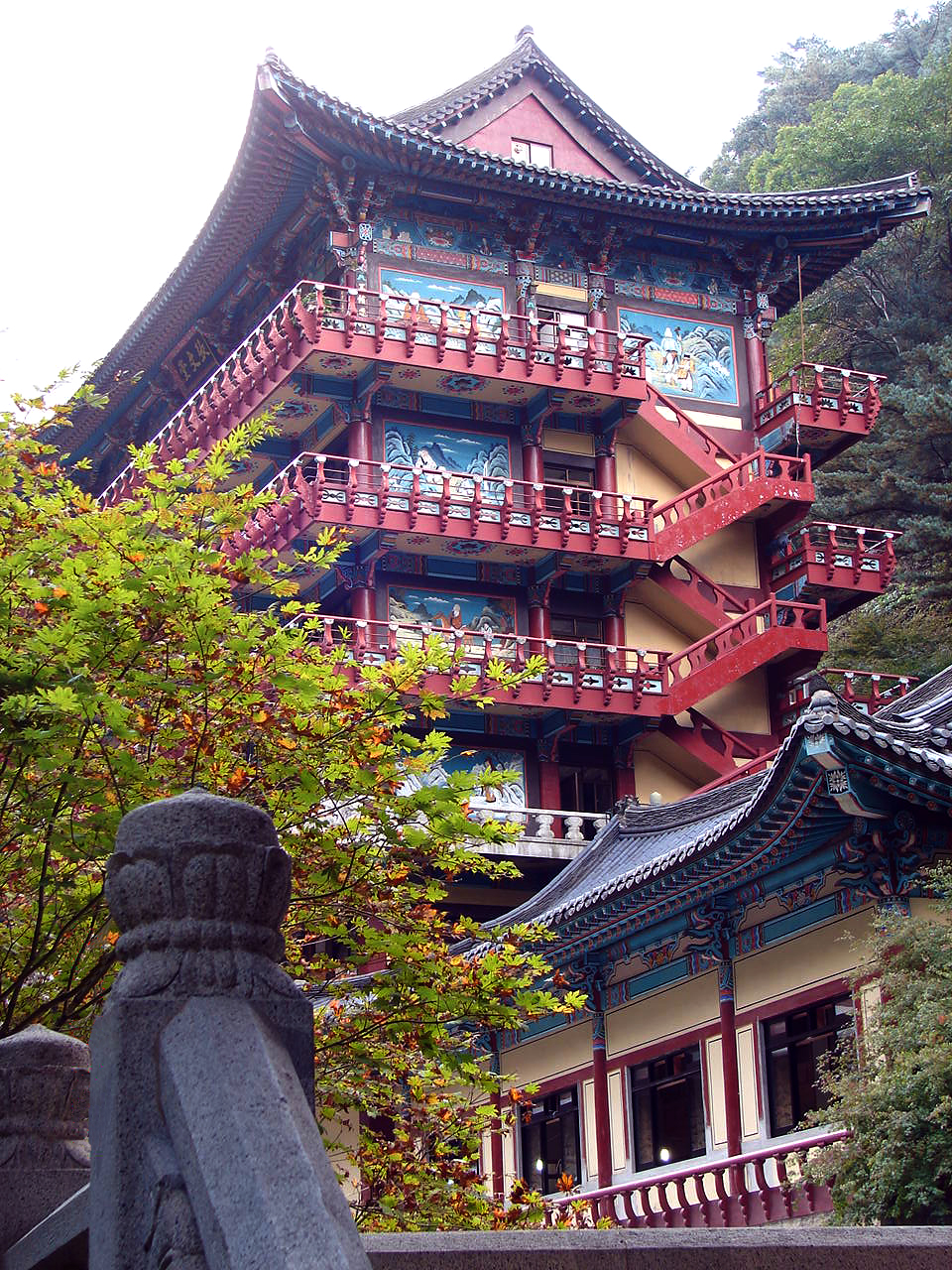
Guinsa Sawoosil (Dormitory)

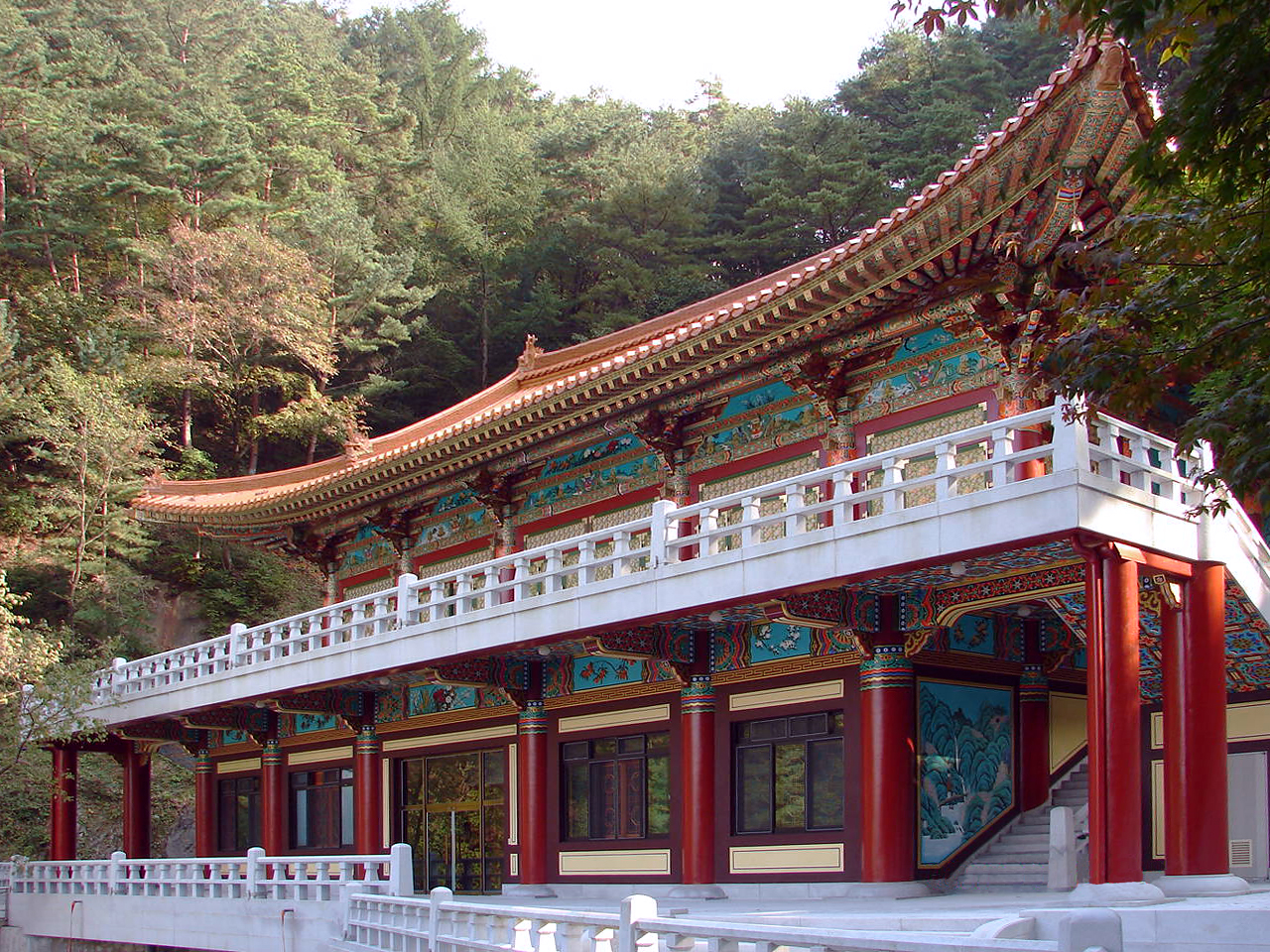
One of the ornate temple halls on the grounds of Guinsa.

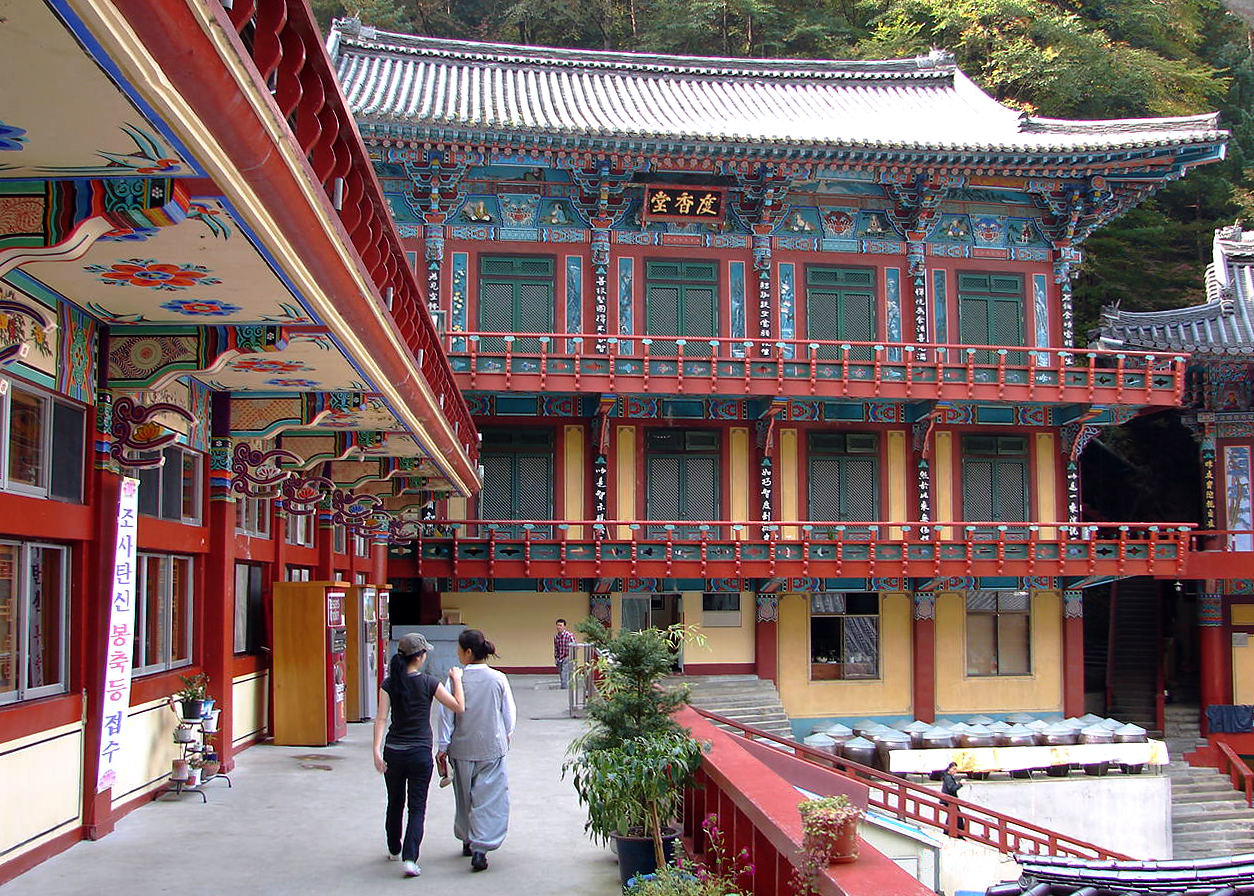
Guinsa Tohang Hall is a cafeteria and dormitory for the monks.

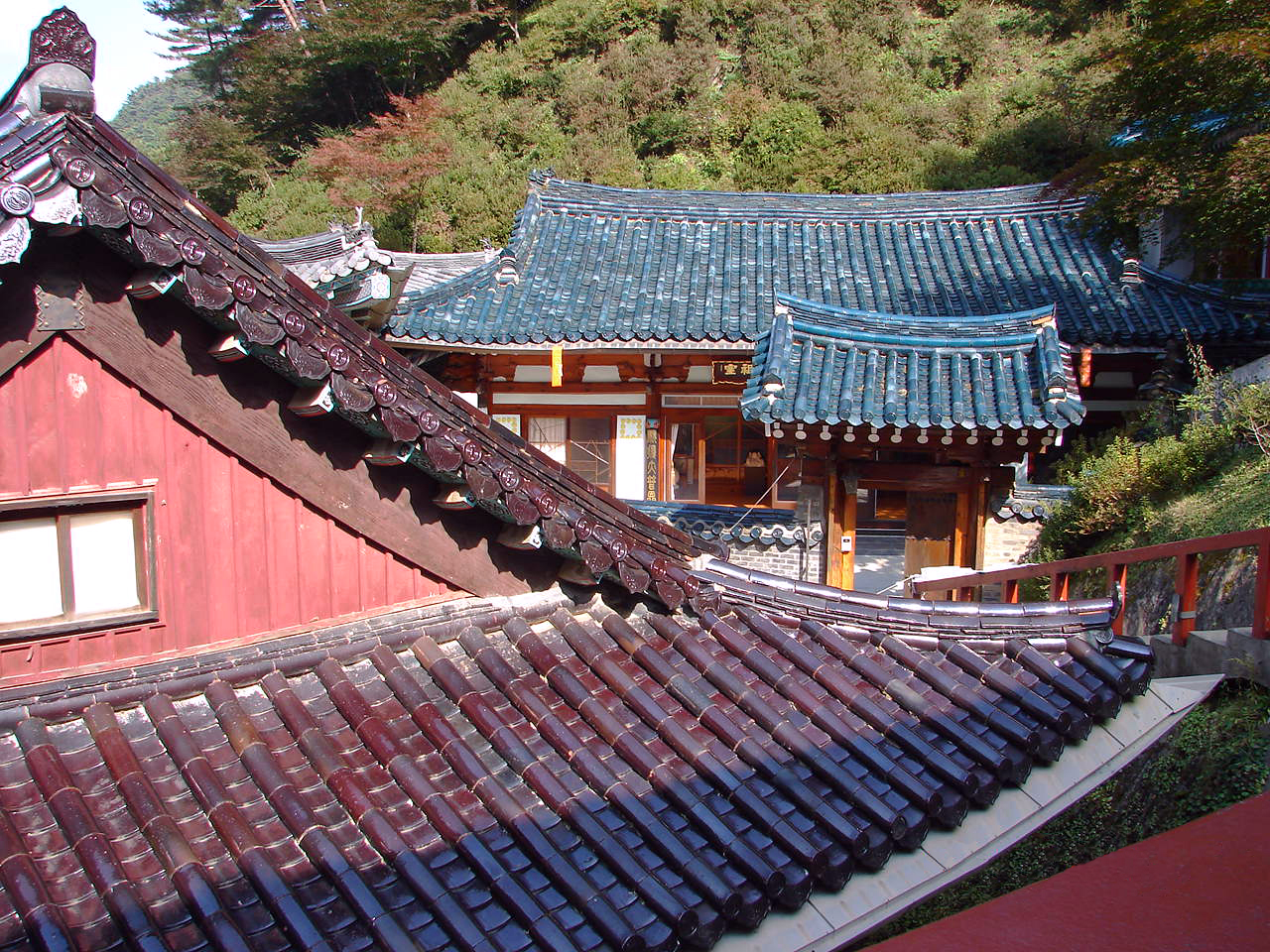
Guinsa Hall with Maroon and Blue-Green Glazed Roof Tiles.

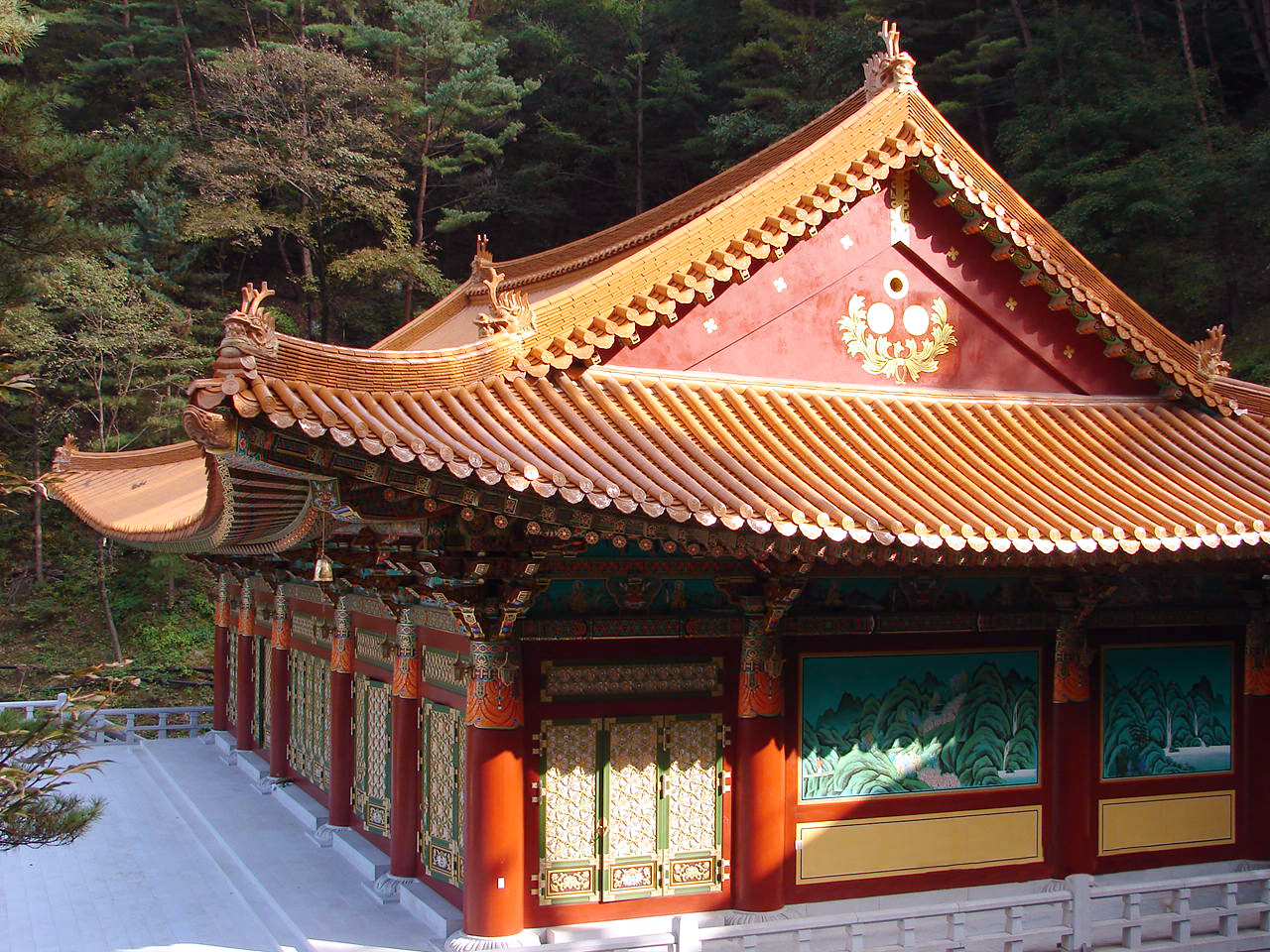
Guinsa's golden glazed roof tiles reminiscent of the roof tile in the Forbidden City in China.

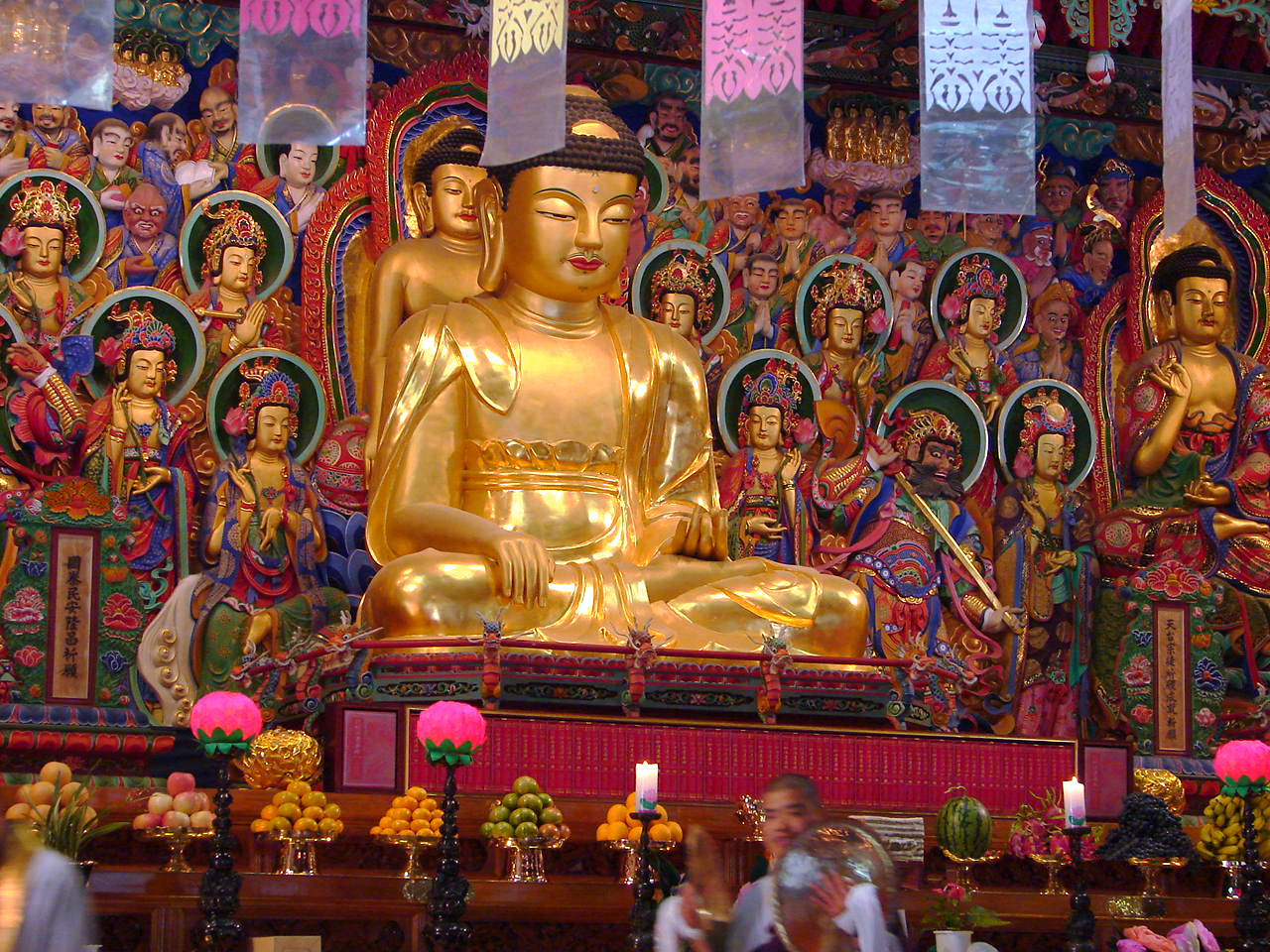
Shakyamuni Buddha in the 5-Story Dharma Law Hall (Ocheung Daebeoptang) housing the impressive gilded main altar of the Buddha Shakyamuni flanked by his attendants.

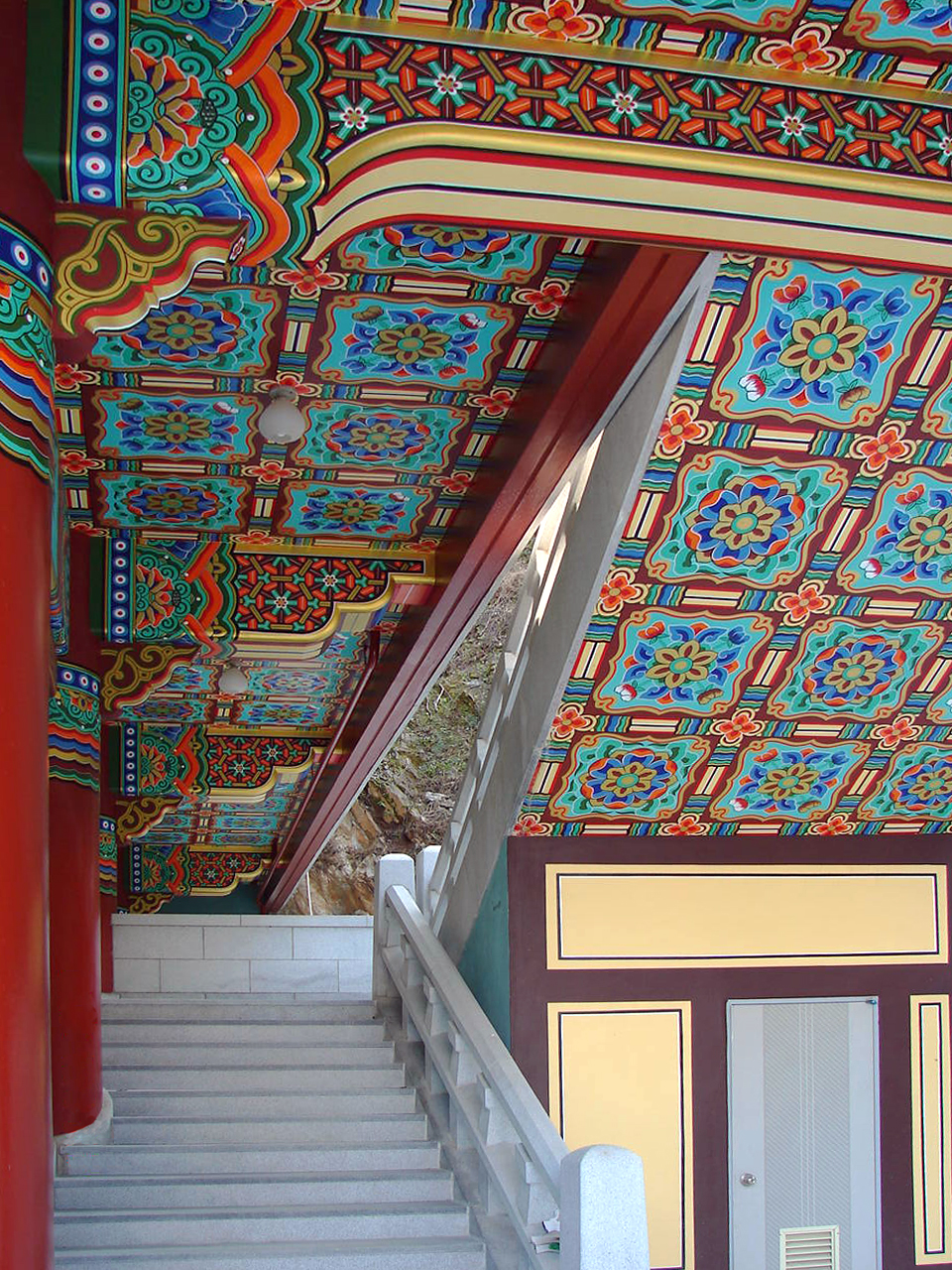
Decorated stairway alongside a Guinsa hall.

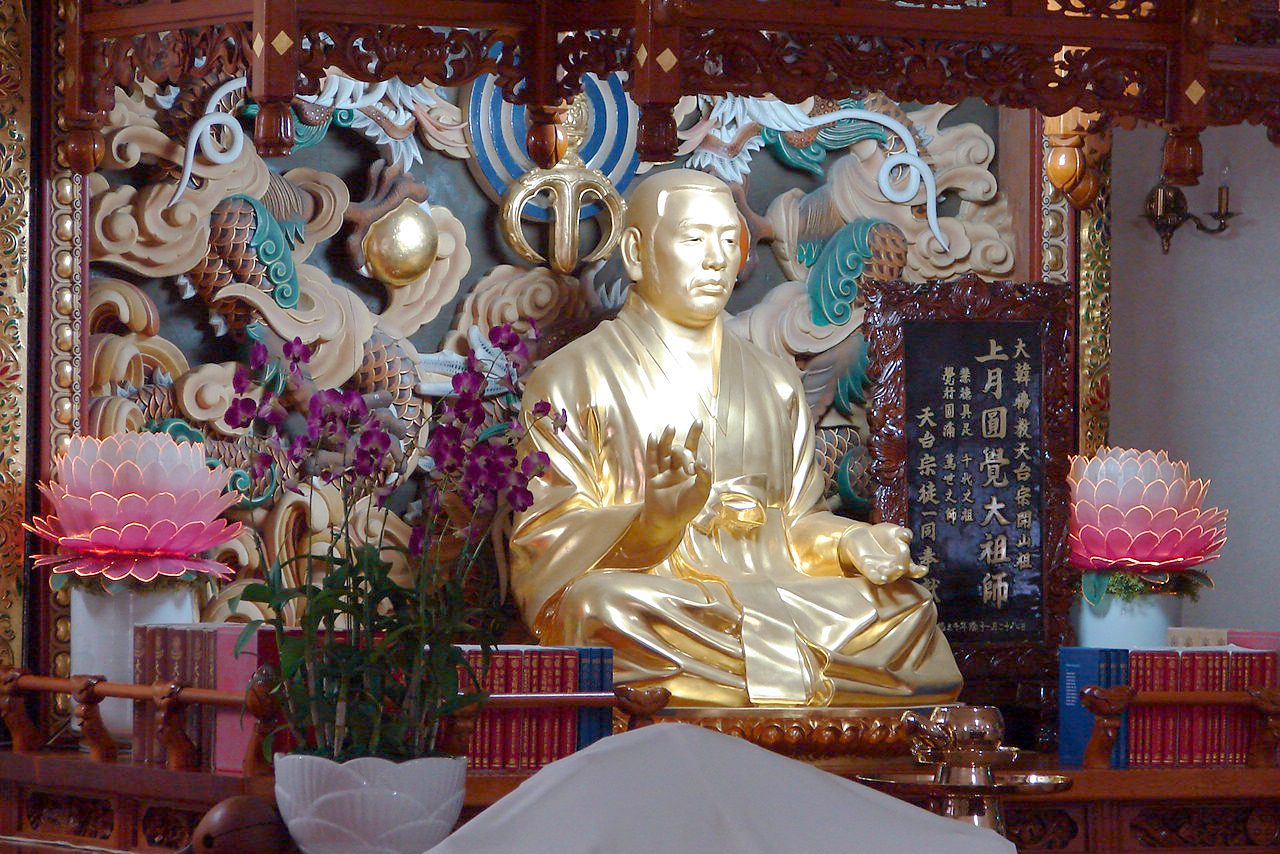
Guinsa's Grand Patriarch Sangwol Wongak's golden image in the hall dedicated to the founder.

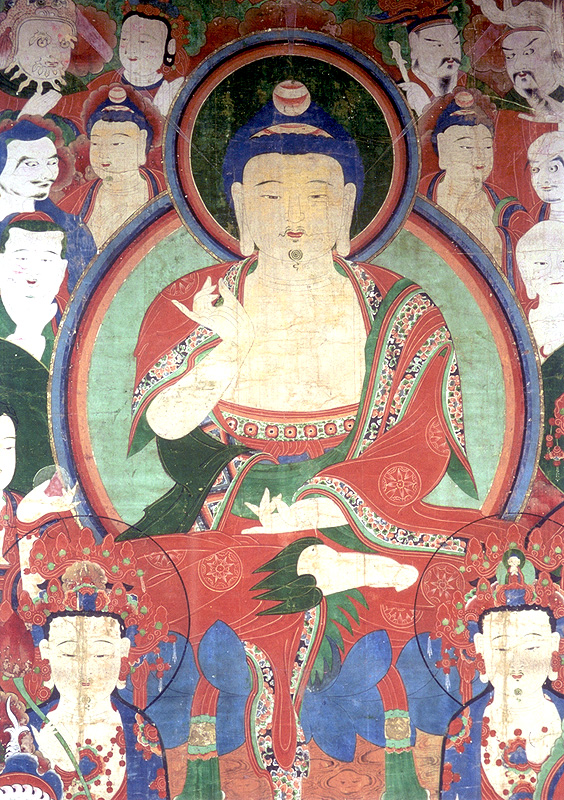
Mural Painting in Guinsa (단양 구인사 아미타회상도)

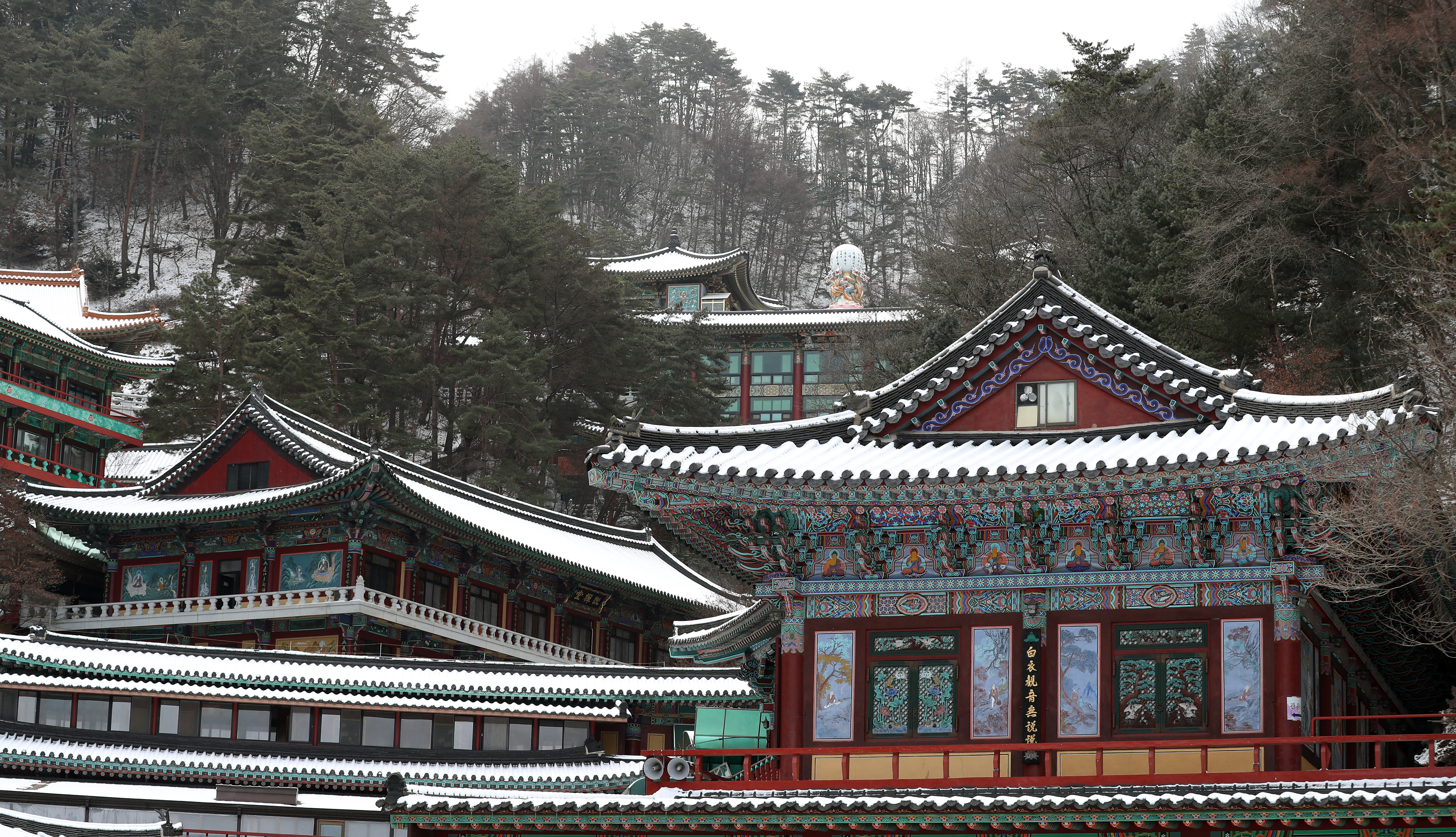

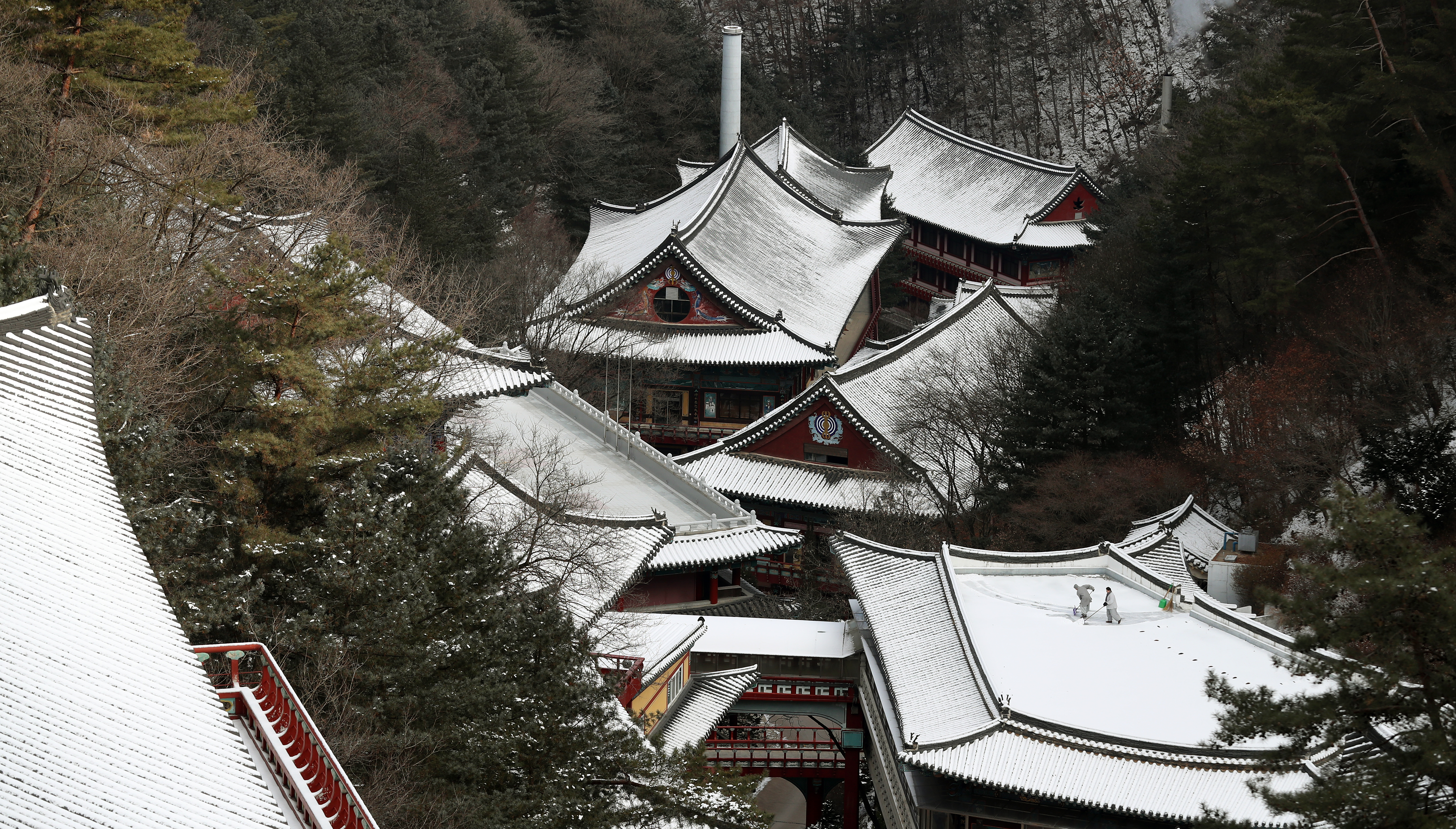

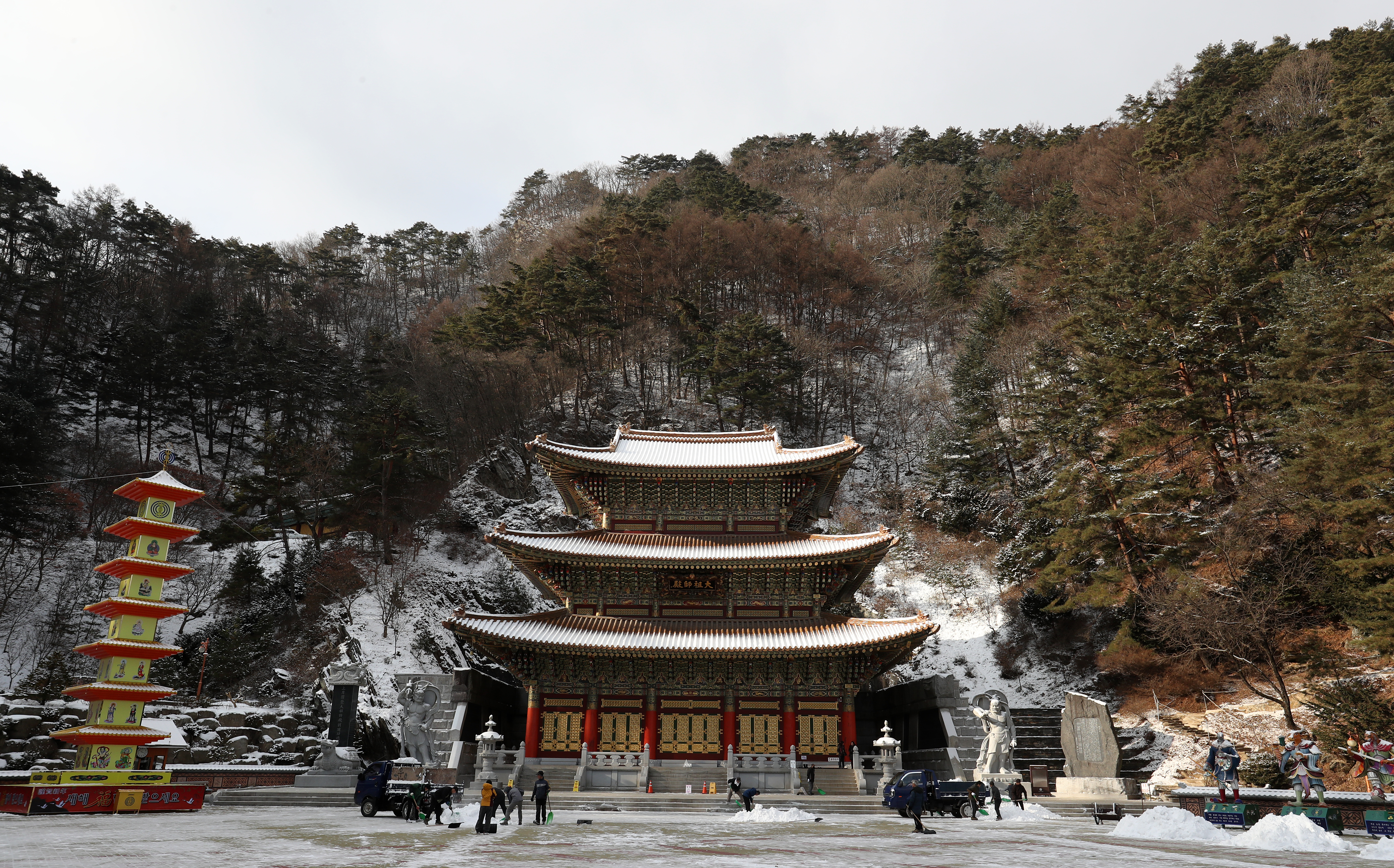
