= Cheontae =

Korean descendant of the Chinese Buddhist school of Tiantai

- Hangul: 천태종
- Hanja: 天台宗
- RR: Cheontaejong
- MR: Ch'ŏnt'aejong

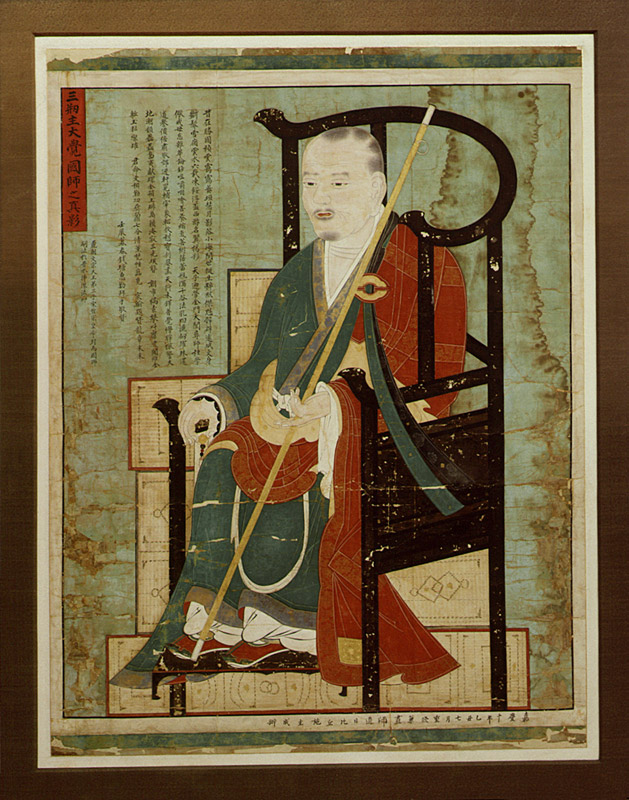
Uicheon, the founder of the Korean Tiantai school

Cheontae (천태, also known as the Korean Buddhist Cheontae sect 대한불교천태종) is the Korean branch of the Chinese Tiantai school, which was founded in 594 by the monk Zhiyi (智顗) during the Sui dynasty. Though Tiantai teachings were introduced to Korea earlier, it was during the Goryeo period that Cheontae was established as an independent school by Daegak Guksa Uicheon (1055–1101), a royal prince and Buddhist scholar.

== Philosophy ==
Uicheon sought to bridge the gap between the doctrinal (Gyo 教) and meditative (Seon 禪) schools by promoting Cheontae teachings, which emphasize the Lotus Sutra as the culmination of the Buddha's teachings. Central to Cheontae doctrine are three key insights:

- All phenomena are fundamentally empty.
- All phenomena have provisional or conventional existence.
- All things are simultaneously empty and provisionally real.

This philosophy teaches that everyday sensory experiences are expressions of the Dharma and pathways to enlightenment. These views are reflected in Korean temple aesthetics, such as the use of colorful Dancheong decorative painting, which contrasts with the minimalist style favored by Japanese Zen traditions.

== History ==
During the Goryeo period, Cheontae gained institutional recognition, coexisting with the Jogye school (曹溪宗). The major Seon temples were collectively known as the Five Mountain Seon Schools (Gusan Seonmun), and the Buddhist landscape was organized under the "Five Orders and Two Schools" (五派二宗), namely the Jogye and Cheontae sects.

In the Joseon Dynasty, Cheontae influence waned. In 1407, King Sejong attempted to reunify various Buddhist schools, and by 1424 the Cheontae tradition was absorbed into the Chongnam sect (摠南宗) and later into the Seon-dominated Buddhist structure known as Seon-Gyo Yangjong (禪敎兩宗), meaning "Two Schools of Seon and Doctrinal Buddhism".

Cheontae re-emerged in the modern period under Park Sangwol (朴上月), also known as Sangwol Wongak Daejo, who established the contemporary Korean Buddhist Cheontae Order. The sect considers Zhiyi, Uicheon, and Park Sangwol as its spiritual forebears.

The order's headquarters are located at Guinsa Temple in Chungcheongbuk-do, near Danyang, and it also operates Geumgang University, a Buddhist university.

As of 2015, the sect's Supreme Patriarch (Jongjeong 宗正) is Venerable Daesongsa Kim Do-yong. The Korean Buddhist Cheontae Order estimates its membership at approximately 1.67 to 2 million adherents.

== Temples ==
The Guinsa Temple (救仁寺) of the Korean Buddhist Cheontae tradition is in Danyang-gun, Chungcheongbuk-do, and is built using a different concrete structure, which is different from the usual Buddhist temples.

=== Number of temples by region ===
==== Korea ====
- Seoul : 6 temples including Gwanmunsa Temple
- Busan Metropolitan City : 5 temples including Samgwangsa Temple
- Incheon Metropolitan City : 1 temple including Hwangnyongsa Temple
- Daegu Metropolitan City: 2 temples including Daeseongsa Temple
- Daejeon Metropolitan City: 2 temples including Gwangsu Temple
- Gwangju Metropolitan City: 1 temple including Geumgwangsa Temple
- Ulsan Metropolitan City: 2 temples including Jeonggwangsa Temple
- Gyeonggi-do : 19 temples including Daegwangsa Temple (with one branch

)

- Gangwon-do : 32 temples including Samwonsa (including 2 pagodas

)

- Chungcheongbuk-do : 10 temples including Myeongjangsa Temple
- Chungcheongnam-do : 9 temples, including Raeunsa and Mansu-sa
- Gyeongsangbuk-do : 37 temples including Hwanghae-sa Temple (including 2 pagodas)
- Gyeongsangnam-do : 19 temples including Wonheungsa Temple and Samhaksa Temple
- Jeolla-do : 5 temples including Manwolsa Temple
- Jeju Special Self-Governing Province: 2 temples including Haeunda Temple

Total: 152 temples (as of 2017)

==== Overseas ====
- Canada: Peace Temple
- Denmark: Gogwangsa Temple
- Australia: Namjangsa Temple

Total: 3 temples (as of 2019)

== Foundation Corporation ==
The Foundation Corporation of the Korean Buddhist Cheontae Order (대한불교천태종, Daehan Bulgyo Cheontaejong) promotes the ideals of patriotic Buddhism, engaged Buddhism, and popular Buddhism. It aims to spread the teachings of the Buddha by realizing the path of sanggu bodhi—the aspiration to attain enlightenment through both mind and body—and to guide all sentient beings, a practice referred to as descending sentient beings or the embodiment of the Great Bodhisattva Mind.

The corporation was officially established on 16 April 1991 under the jurisdiction of the Ministry of Culture, Sports and Tourism of the Republic of Korea. Its mission is to promote personal spiritual development and the realization of a Buddhist nation by encouraging all Koreans to practice the Dharma and cultivate a noble and healthy national spirit.

The administrative office is located at 132–1, Baekjari, Yeongchun-myeon, Danyang-gun, Chungcheongbuk-do, South Korea.

=== Major Projects ===
- Conducting education and academic research related to the propagation and transmission of Korean Tendai Buddhism.
- Maintenance and management of religious properties, including temples, monasteries, and related facilities.
- Operation of social welfare programs such as nursing homes and orphanages.
- Translation of Buddhist scriptures and publication of religious literature.
- Protection, education, and training of monastics.
- Cultural initiatives to develop and promote Korean Buddhist heritage.
- Planning and promotion of Buddhist events and public outreach activities.
- Any other activities deemed necessary to fulfill the foundation's objectives.

== See also ==
- Zhiyi
- Uicheon
- Tiantai Buddhism
- Korean Buddhism
- Guinsa
- Ryongtongsa
- Geumgang University
