= Ŭich'ŏn =

Korean monk and founder of Cheontae (1055–1101)

Uicheon
- Daegakguksa ('National Preceptor Grand Enlightenment')
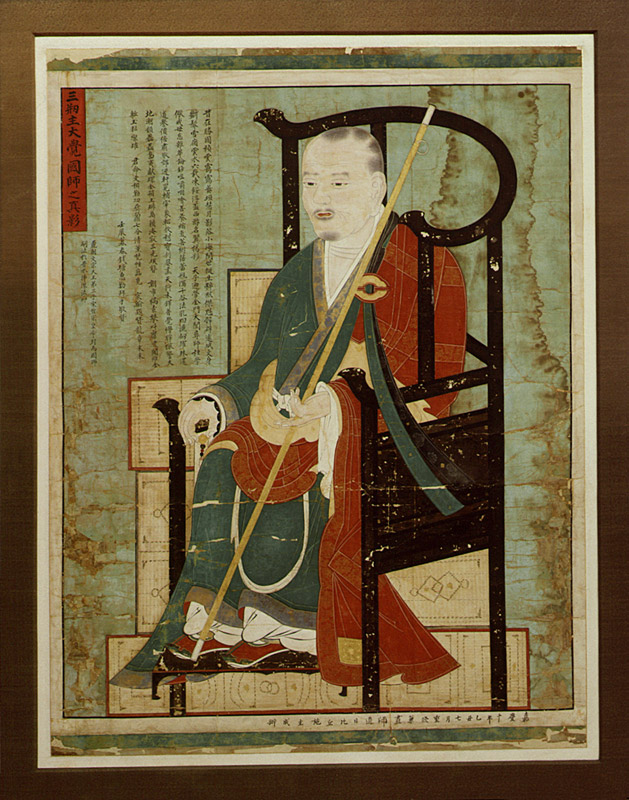
- Portrait of Uicheon in Seonamsa, 48-1, Jukhak-ri, Seungju-eup, Suncheon, South Jeolla Province
- Born: Wang Hu; 1055; Kaegyŏng, Goryeo
- Died: 1101 (age 46); Chongji Temple (총지사摠持寺), Kaegyŏng, Goryeo
- Burial: Ryongtongsa, Kaesong
- House: House of Wang
- Father: Munjong of Goryeo
- Mother: Queen Inye of the Incheon Yi clan
- Religion: Buddhism

Korean name
- Hangul: 왕후; 왕석후
- Hanja: 王煦; 王釋煦
- RR: Wang Hu; Wang Seokhu
- MR: Wang Hu; Wang Sŏkhu

Art name
- Hangul: 우세
- Hanja: 祐世
- RR: Use
- MR: Use

Courtesy name
- Hangul: 의천
- Hanja: 義天
- RR: Uicheon
- MR: Ŭich'ŏn

Posthumous name
- Hangul: 대각국사
- Hanja: 大覺國師
- RR: Daegakguksa
- MR: Taegakkuksa

Uicheon (28 September 1055 – 5 October 1101) was a Korean prince and influential Buddhist scholar-monk of the Goryeo period (918–1392). He was the fourth son of King Munjong (1046–1083) and Queen Inye from the Gyeongwon Yi clan and the younger brother of Sunjong, Seonjong, and Sukjong.

== Overview ==
At age 11, Uicheon volunteered to become a Buddhist monk. In 1065, he studied at the Yeongtong Temple (영통사; 靈通寺) under Buddhist monk Nanwon (난원; 爛圓) who was his maternal relative and studied the Buddhist and Confucian canons. Uicheon displayed exceptional talents from a young age, and he dedicated himself to the extensive study of the Chinese Buddhist canon, the works of the various East Asian Buddhist schools, along with the Chinese classics.

Uicheon lived at Ryongtongsa in Kaesong for much of his life and was buried there, where his tomb can be found. He was a prolific author, scholar and Buddhist teacher who specialized in Huayan studies and the Avataṃsaka Sūtra, having studied in China with Huayan masters. He is also known for introducing the works of the Cheontae school to Korean Buddhism. He was also known by the title Daegak Guksa (大覺國師, "State Preceptor Great Awakening" (Note: Guksa was his title ('National Preceptor'), while Daegak was his posthumous Dharma name, meaning "Grand Enlightenment".)).

Uicheon's reputation eventually reached China, and he eventually was patronized by Chinese Emperor Zhezong. Uicheon and his party eventually visited the Song Dynasty capital and met with Emperor Zhezong. Subsequently, they visited several prominent monasteries such as Jingyuan Monastery (淨源寺) and Yanglian Monastery (懹璉寺), where they engaged in discussions with over 50 eminent monks. Uicheon made many connections with Chinese masters during this time, particularly with scholars of the Huayan tradition such as Jinshui Jingyuan (靜源, 1011–1088) with whom he continued to exchange letters after returning to Korea. Jingyuan also sent Uicheon Huayan texts.

Uicheon also visited the Liao dynasty, visiting various key sites and meeting with Liao monks. He even became a priest for Emperor Daozong of Liao before returning to Korea.

Back in Korea, Uicheon's reputation had continued to grow and he was warmly welcomed. King Seonjong recognized the importance of reviving Buddhism and invited Uicheon to assume the position of head monk at Heungwang Temple. He established a repository for the scriptures at Heungwang Temple and also collected scriptures from China and Japan. He published the "Collection of the Avataṃsaka Sūtra" (화엄소초), which consisted of more than 4,740 volumes.

From 1073 to 1090, Uicheon collected numerous Buddhist commentaries from Korea, China, the Khitan Empire and Japan, which were published as the "Goryeo Catalog of Sutras" (or "Goryeo Supplement to the Canon").

In his later life, Uicheon continued his long distance engagement with Song Dynasty scholars while also teaching Korean disciples. His legacy includes compilations such as "New Compilation of the Teachings of the Seon Sect" (신편제종교장총록), and "Songs and Trees of the Stone Garden" (석원사림), among others.

== Works ==
- Sinpyeonjejonggyojangchongnok vol. 3 (신편제종교장총록 3권)
- Sinjipwonjongmullyu vol. 22 (신집원종문류; 新集圓宗文類 22권)
- Seokwonsarim vol. 250 (석원사림; 釋苑詞林 250권)
- Daegakguksamunjib vol. 23 of deeds and poems (대각국사문집; 大覺國師文集 23권 행적과 시 문집)
- Daegakguksawoejip vol. 13 (대각국사외집; 大覺國師外集 13권)
- Ganjeongseongyusiknondangwa vol. 3 (간정성유식론단과; 刊定成唯識論單科 3권)
- Cheontaesagyouiju vol. 3 (천태사교의주; 天台四敎儀註 3권)

== See also ==
- Tiantai Buddhism
- Korean Buddhism
- Cheontae
- Jinul
- Ryongtongsa
