= Gokul Global University =

University in Gujarat, India

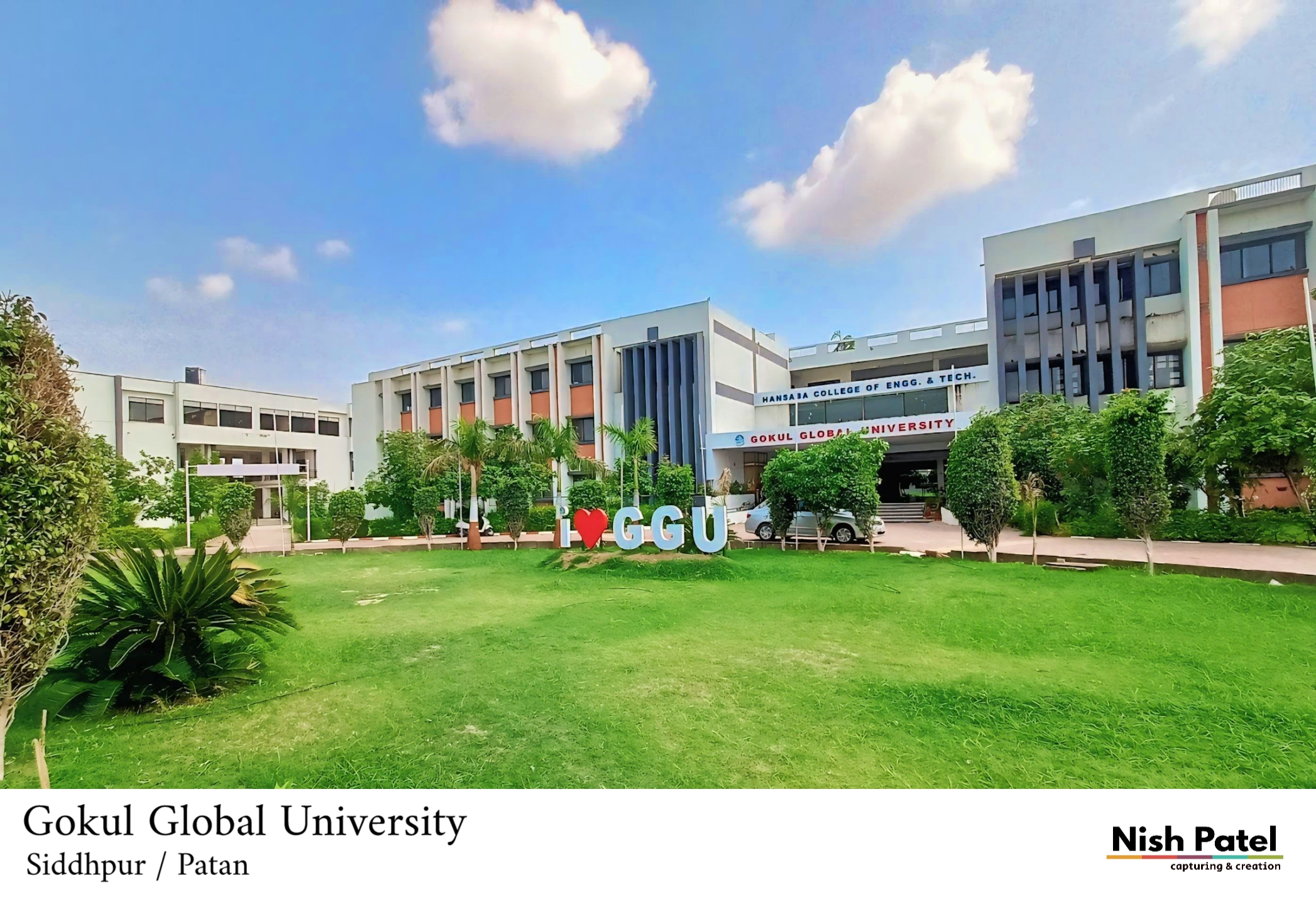
- Motto in English: Knowledge Forever
- Type: Private
- Established: 2018
- Affiliations: UGC
- President: Balvantsinh Rajput
- Vice-Chancellor: Prof (Dr.) M. S. Rao
- Location: Sidhpur, Gujarat, India
- Website: www.gokuluniversity.ac.in

Gokul Global University (GGU) is a private university located in Sidhpur, Patan district, Gujarat, India. It was established on 23 March 2018 by the Gokul Foundation under Gujarat Private Universities (Amendment) Act, 2018, after the Bill was approved by the Gujarat Legislative Assembly in February 2018.

== Constitute institutions ==
The university includes the following constituent institutes:

- Faculty of Engineering
- Faculty of Ayurveda
- Faculty of Homoeopathy
- Faculty of Pharmacy
- Faculty of Allied Health Professions
- Faculty of Agriculture
- Faculty of Professional Studies
- Faculty of Nursing
- Faculty of Law
- Faculty of Science
- Faculty of Commerce and Management
- Faculty of Arts, Humanities & Social Science
- Faculty of Computer Science & Applications
