= Godavari Global University =

Private university in Andhra Pradesh, India

- గోదావరి గ్లోబల్ విశ్వవిద్యాలయం
- Other name: GGU
- Former names: Godavari Institute of Engineering and Technology (GIET)
- Type: State Private University
- Established: 2024
- Founder: K. V. V. Satyanarayana Raju
- Accreditation: NAAC (A++)
- Affiliations: UGC
- Academic affiliations: AICTE, NBA
- Chancellor: K.V.V. Satyanarayana Raju
- Vice-Chancellor: U. Chandra Sekhar
- Location: Rajamahendravaram, Andhra Pradesh, 533296, India; 17.0627851°N 81.8677494°E
- Campus: 300 acres (120 ha); Urban
- Origin: Upgraded from Godavari Institute of Engineering and Technology (established 1998)
- Website: ggu.edu.in

- Location in Andhra Pradesh Location in India

Godavari Global University is a private university located in Rajamahendravaram, in the East Godavari district of Andhra Pradesh, India. It was established in 2024 under the Andhra Pradesh Private Universities (Establishment and Regulation) Amendment Act, 2024, through the upgradation of the Godavari Institute of Engineering and Technology, which was founded in 1998.

The university is recognised by the University Grants Commission, approved by the All India Council for Technical Education, and has its programmes accredited by the National Board of Accreditation. It has also received an 'A++' grade from the National Assessment and Accreditation Council.

== History ==
Godavari Global University was established in 2024 in Rajahmundry, Andhra Pradesh, after the Andhra Pradesh Legislative Assembly passed the Andhra Pradesh Private Universities (Establishment and Regulation) Amendment Act, 2024, under which the university was approved.

The university developed out of the Godavari Institute of Engineering and Technology, which had been operating since 1998, and was among the institutions approved for conversion into a private university under the State's brownfield category. The institute was affiliated with Jawaharlal Nehru Technological University, Kakinada, and became autonomous in 2014 after receiving approval from the University Grants Commission. After the university was established, the Godavari Institute of Engineering and Technology became a constituent college of the university.

In May 2025, the university signed a memorandum of understanding with the IBM Innovation Centre for Education to introduce courses in artificial intelligence, machine learning, and data science. It also tied up with Macquarie University and KPMG in June 2025 to develop specialized curricula, including a cybersecurity track within its academic programs.

In 2015, the institute established a remote robotic laboratory in collaboration with the Germany-based European Centre for Mechatronics, allowing students to operate industrial machinery remotely.

== Academics ==
Godavari Global University offers undergraduate, postgraduate, and doctoral degrees in engineering, computing, health sciences, pharmacy, management, commerce, agriculture, forensic science, and multimedia. Its programs include B.Tech, M.Tech, BCA, MCA, B.Pharm, Pharm.D, M.Pharm, BBA, MBA, B.Com, and Ph.D.

== Ranking ==
university rankings

Engineering – India
- NIRF (2022): 201–250
- NIRF (2023): 201–300
- NIRF (2024): 201–300

In 2025, Outlook India, in collaboration with the Indian Centre for Academic Rankings and Excellence (ICARE), placed Godavari Global University 23rd in its "Top 50 State Private Universities in India" ranking.

In 2024, Outlook ranked the university 25th in its "Top 50 State Private Universities in India" list, with a score of 868.42 based on parameters including academic and research excellence, industry interface and placement, infrastructure and facilities, governance and extension, and diversity and outreach.

In the National Institutional Ranking Framework rankings released by the Ministry of Education, the university's engineering programmes were placed in the 201–300 band in both 2024 and 2025. Outlook ranked the institution 86th among top engineering colleges in India in 2010 and 128th in 2013.

== Student life ==
The university organizes the annual Maitri youth festival, which features sports, cultural activities, and student competitions.

In 2025, the university hosted a number of academic and institutional events, including a national seminar on research and innovation, an Innovation Startup Day held in collaboration with organisations such as the Wadhwani Foundation, TiE, Startup Andhra Pradesh and the National Research Development Corporation (NRDC), and an international conference on green economy and sustainable development in collaboration with National Sun Yat-sen University, Taiwan.

== See also ==
- List of private universities in India
- List of institutions of higher education in Andhra Pradesh
