= Geumgang University =

University in Nonsan, South Korea

Coordinates: 36.3054°N 127.1952°E

Geumgang University (금강 대학교)
- Type: Private
- Established: 2003
- Students: 487
- Undergraduates: 477
- Postgraduates: 10
- Location: Sangwol-myeon, Nonsan-si, Chungcheongnam-do, South Korea
- Campus: Rural
- Website: www.ggu.ac.kr

- Geumgang University
- Hangul: 금강대학교
- Hanja: 金剛大學校
- RR: Geumgang daehakgyo
- MR: Kŭmgang taehakkyo

Geumgang University is a South Korean university with a residential college model, located in the countryside next to Gyeryong Mountain, between Nonsan and Daejeon. The campus is within the administrative boundaries of Nonsan's Sangwol-myeon district.

The university was founded in 2003. For all students who maintain a 3.0 GPA average, there is no tuition fee, and housing is provided free of charge. Geumgang University is a residential college. It is a full residential college in that, unlike most universities in Korea, 100% of students live on-campus.

In 2016, courses were offered in the following subjects:

- School of Buddhist Studies & Social Welfare
- School of International Trade & Public Administration
- School of Social Studies
- Information Science

The student body is primarily undergraduates. There is a PhD program available only in the School of Buddhist Studies & Social Welfare.

== Foreign Exchange ==
The university offers a fifteen-week intensive course in Korean language and culture. This program is tuition-free to all accepted students. Exchange students room with a Korean student at Geumgang University, and engage in four hours per week of English coaching while in the program. Each year, approximately 25 foreign students attend the language program. Geumgang University also has a student exchange program with the University of the West, a Buddhist-founded university in the United States.

There are many foreign faculty members as well. The Information Science department is 2/3 foreign faculty, with professors from Yale and Columbia.

A temple-stay program is under construction and will be available in July 2016.
