= Consort Yi =

Consort Yi may refer to:

== Consorts with the surname Yi ==
- Queen Yongmok (fl. 11th century), wife of Jeongjong of Goryeo
- Queen Inye (died 1092), second wife of Munjong of Goryeo
- Royal Consort Ingyeong Hyeon-Bi (fl. 11th century), third wife of Munjong of Goryeo
- Royal Consort Injeol Hyeon-Bi (died 1082), fourth wife of Munjong of Goryeo
- Royal Consort Jeongsin Hyeon-Bi (fl. 11th century), first wife of Seonjong of Goryeo
- Queen Sasuk (c. 1065–1107), second wife of Seonjong of Goryeo
- Princess Wonsin (fl. 11th century), third wife of Seonjong of Goryeo
- Queen Gyeonghwa (1079–1109), first wife of Yejong of Goryeo
- Queen Sundeok (1094–1118), second wife of Yejong of Goryeo
- Queen Sapyeong (died c. 1174), wife of Gangjong of Goryeo
- Queen Hyogong (fl. 1392), wife of Mokjo of Joseon
- Consort Yi (Ming dynasty) (1392–1421), concubine of the Yongle Emperor
- Royal Consort Anbin Yi (1622–1693), concubine of Hyojong of Joseon
- Royal Noble Consort Yeongbin Yi (1696–1764), concubine of Yeongjo of Joseon
- Internal Princess Consort Hanchang (1818–1874), wife of Internal Prince Yeoseong

== Consorts with the title Consort Yi ==
- Consort Yi (Kangxi) (1660–1733), concubine of the Kangxi Emperor
- Concubine Yi (Qianlong) (died 1736), concubine of the Qianlong Emperor
- Empress Dowager Cixi (1835–1908), concubine of the Xianfeng Emperor

== See also ==
- Consort Li (disambiguation)
