= Queen Sasuk =

Korean noblewoman (c. 1065 – c. 1107)

Queen Sasuk 사숙왕후

Queen consort of Goryeo
- Tenure: 1083–1094
- Coronation: 1083
- Predecessor: Royal Consort Jeongsin
- Successor: Queen Myeongui

Queen dowager of Goryeo
- Tenure / Regency: 1094–1095/7
- Coronation: 1094
- Predecessor: Queen Dowager Inye
- Successor: Queen Dowager Myeongui
- Regent Monarch: King Heonjong (son)
- Born: c.1065 Goryeo
- Died: c.1107 (aged about mid 40s); Goryeo
- Burial: Illeung tomb
- Spouse: Seonjong of Goryeo (before 1083)
- Issue: Heonjong of Goryeo; An unnamed daughter Princess Suan
Regnal name
- Consort Yeonhwa (연화궁비; 延和宮妃); Concubine of Duke Gukwon (국원공빈; 國原公賓); Duchess Consort Gukwon (국원공비; 國原公妃); Queen Mother Sasuk (사숙태후; 思肅太后); Grand Queen Mother Sasuk (사숙왕태후; 思肅王太后)
Posthumous name
- Queen Gwangsuk Jeonghwa Sasuk (광숙정화사숙왕후; 匡肅貞和思肅王后); Queen Mother Gwangsuk Jeonghwa Sasuk (광숙정화사숙태후; 匡肅貞和思肅太后)
- House: Gyeongwon Yi clan
- Father: Yi Sŏk (이석)

Queen Sasuk of the Gyeongwon Yi clan (Korean: 사숙왕후 이씨; Hanja: 思肅王后 李氏; c.1065 – c.1107) was a Korean Goryeo queen consort as the second wife of her first cousin, King Seonjong of Goryeo, and the mother of his successor, King Heonjong. She was the Regent of Goryeo during the minority of her son in 1094 and 1095. Princess Wonsin, Princess Janggyeong, Yi Cha-gyŏm, and Yi Cha-ryang were her first cousins while Lady Jeongsin was her first cousin once removed.

== Biography ==
=== Marriage and Palace life ===
She married Seonjong, the second son of her aunt, Queen Inye, when he was still Duke Gukwon (국원공) and then became Concubine of Duke Gukwon (국원공빈; 國原公賓). But after his first wife's death, she formally became Duchess Consort Gukwon (국원공비; 國原公妃) and lived in the Duke's manor (공부; 公府) until his ascension. In 1083, he ascended the throne and following this, she was given the royal title of Consort Yeonhwa (연화궁비; 延和宮妃) while living in Yeonhwa Palace (연화궁; 延和宮). They later had a son in June 1084 and 2 daughters. But, misfortune befell on them with their eldest daughter died too early after birth and the other daughter was born blind and would not have a chance to marry.

=== Regency and death ===
Meanwhile, King Seonjong died in 1094 due to his illness and their only young son became the new King, Heonjong. Because the new king was just 11 years old at this time, his mother then became and acted as his regent who presided over and executed all government affairs including military and administrative affairs. As a queen mother, she moved to Yeongnyeong Mansion (영녕부; 永寧府) in Junghwa Hall (중화전; 中和殿) from her reigned day on 1 June in order to purpose the strengthening of the royal power. In other words, she went directly to the court and observed the court affairs, also her orders was "Je" (제; 制) that corresponded to the King's orders and commands.

In 1095, Duke Gyerim became the new King after takinh over the young King's throne. While under such circumstances, the queen mother's cousin, Yi Cha-ŭi (이자의), must have lost his life after trying to revolt against Gyerim by making Wang Yun ascend the throne. The young king abdicated to his uncle after 1 year and 5 months of reign. Her official residence was closed under Gyerim's command and her power was completely cut off. Together with her son, they returned to her old palace where the late king stayed in when he was still a Duke.

In "Heungseong Palace" (흥성궁; 興盛宮), the two lived quietly and Heonjong died 2 years later in 1097. From this time, she was described as living a life of virtue, although she became more lonely than before, and was said to have lived a life without problems until her death in around 1107 at 42 to 43 years old. After her death, she was later enshrined at her husband's shrine.

== Afterlife ==
King Sukjong's eldest son, King Yejong, buried her in Illeung tomb, Gaeseong, along with her husband and held her ritual. She was said to have been suffered a lot after her son's deposition from the throne during the reign of King Sukjong. When King Yejong discussed about enshrining Consort Jeongsin in Seonjong's tomb, the officials said,

"Worty Consort Jeongsin wasn't long as the consort of Duke Gukwon and the Queen Mother wasn't the concubine of Duke Gukwon. Since her son, Heonjong succeeded the throne and her virtue wasn't lost until he left the throne, it was right to marry the queen mother. Also, she had contributed many things until she became the queen."
"정신현비는 국원공의 비(妃)로 있은 기간이 오래지 않았고, 태후는 국원공의 비빈으로서 왕비가 될 때까지 내조한 공이 많습니다. 그리고 아들인 헌종이 왕위를 계승하고 이후 퇴거할 때까지 그 덕을 잃은 것이 없으니 태후를 합사하는 것이 옳습니다."

From this point, it can be seen that Yi played a certain role as the spouse of Duke Gukwon and in Goryeosa, (임조칭제, 臨朝稱制; Imjochingje) referred to the political power of the Queen Mother which she used for her regency on behalf of the young-weak King. She was known to exert her political influence when she was a regent.

Some people have said,

"Queen Sasuk, a woman who enjoyed the highest power as a regent and was born as a daughter in the representative noble family during the period when Goryeo's noble aristocratic politics were prosperous."
"사숙태후는 고려의 문벌귀족 정치가 성하던 시절 대표 문벌가문의 딸로서 섭정을 하며 최고의 권력을 누렸던 여성이라 할 수 있다."

— 사숙태후 - 이투데이

=== Posthumous name ===
- In April 1140 (18th year reign of King Injong), name Jeong-hwa (정화; 貞和) was added.
- In October 1253 (40th year reign of King Gojong), name Gwang-suk (광숙; 匡肅) was added to her posthumous name too.
