= Princess Yeondeok =

Princess Yeondeok (연덕궁주, 延德宮主; lit. 'Royal Lady (Master) of the Yeondeok Palace') was a title given to the Goryeo Queen Consort or Royal Consort. Those who held this title may lived in Yeondeok Palace (연덕궁, 延德宮), they may refer to:

- Queen Wonhye (원혜왕후), the first consort who held this title. She was King Hyeonjong's 4th wife.
- Queen Inye (인예왕후), the second consort who held this title. She was King Munjong's 3rd wife.
- Queen Myeongui (명의왕후), the third consort who held this title. She was King Sukjong's only wife.
- Queen Sundeok (순덕왕후), the fourth consort who held this title. She was King Yejong's 2nd wife.
- Deposed Queen Yi (폐비 이씨), the fifth consort who held this title. She was King Injong's 1st wife.
- Queen Gongye (공예왕후), the sixth consort who held this title. She was King Injong's 3rd wife.
- Queen Wondeok (원덕왕후), the seventh consort who held this title. She was King Gangjong's 2nd wife.
