= Princess Heunggyeong =

Princess of Goryeo (fl. 12th century)

Princess Heunggyeong 흥경공주

Princess of Goryeo
- Predecessor: Princess Seungdeok
- Successor: Princess Wang
- Monarch: Wang U, King Yejong
- Died: 1176; Goryeo
- Husband: Wang Kyŏng; second cousin
- House: Wang
- Father: Yejong of Goryeo
- Mother: Queen Sundeok of the Gyeongwon Yi clan
- Religion: Buddhism

Princess Heunggyeong (Korean: 흥경공주; Hanja: 興慶公主; d. 1176) was a Goryeo Royal Princess as the youngest daughter of King Yejong and Queen Sundeok, also the youngest sister of King Injong.

== Biography ==
=== Biography ===
It seems that she was born after 1109 not long after her older sister, Princess Seungdeok. She was the paternal aunt of the three rulers: Uijong, Myeongjong and Sinjong. Her maternal grandfather was Yi Cha-gyŏm from the powerful Gyeongwon Yi clan.

She was firstly called 'Princess–"gungju" (흥경궁주; 興慶宮主) but later on 9 October 1124 changed into Princess–"gongju" (흥경공주; 興慶公主). Then, she married Wang Kyŏng, Duke Anpyeong (왕경 안평공) and died in 1176 (6th year reign of King Myeongjong).
