= Princess Janggyeong =

Queen Consort of Goryeo (fl. 11th century)

Princess Janggyeong 장경궁주
- Spouse: Sunjong of Goryeo (m. 1083–1083)
- House: Gyeongwon Yi clan
- Father: Yi Ho (이호)
- Religion: Buddhism

Princess Janggyeong of the Gyeongwon Yi clan (Korean: 장경궁주 이씨; Hanja: 長慶宮主 李氏) was the third wife of King Sunjong of Goryeo.

She became his consort in 1083 and after his death, she stayed live outside the palace. She was then discovered to have committed adultery with a male slave from the palace, those made her being deposed from her position. Yi Cha-gyŏm, her older brother, became a noble and was a high-ranked official, but due to her adultery, he was also involved in this case and dismissed from his position. After Crown Prince Wang U's ascension to the throne, his status was restored and his daughter become Yejong's queen.

== Family ==
- Father: Yi Ho (이호)
  - Brother: Yi Cha-gyŏm ( d. 1126)
    - Niece: Queen Sundeok (d. 1118)
    - Niece: Deposed Princess Yeondeok (d. 1139)
    - Niece: Deposed Princess Bokchang (d. 1195)
  - Brother: Yi Cha-ryang (이자량; d. 1123)
- Husband, formerly first cousin: Sunjong of Goryeo – No issue.
