= Ch'ŏk Chun'gyŏng =

Goryeo government official

- Hangul: 척준경
- Hanja: 拓俊京
- RR: Cheok Jungyeong
- MR: Ch'ŏk Chun'gyŏng

Alternative reading
- Hangul: 탁준경
- RR: Tak Jungyeong
- MR: T'ak Chun'gyŏng

Ch'ŏk Chun'gyŏng (Korean: 척준경; Hanja: 拓俊京; ? – 1144), also sometimes known as T'ak Chun'gyŏng (Note: The hanja character 拓 can be read as both Ch'ŏk (척) or T'ak (탁).) (탁준경), was a Korean soldier and politician who lived during the Goryeo period.

== Biography ==
=== Early life ===
Ch'ŏk Chun'gyŏng hailed from Kokju (곡주; 谷州; modern-day Koksan County, North Korea) and was the son of Ch'ŏk Wigong (척위공; 拓謂恭), of the Koksan Ch'ŏk clan. He was of a poor hyangni (local functionary) background. Due to the poverty of his family, he was unable to pursue his education and instead associated with delinquents. He would become the subordinate of Duke Gyerim. After Duke Gyerim became King Sukjong, he appointed Ch'ŏk as an administrative aide of the Security Council (추밀원별가; 樞密院別駕).

=== Fighting the Jurchens ===
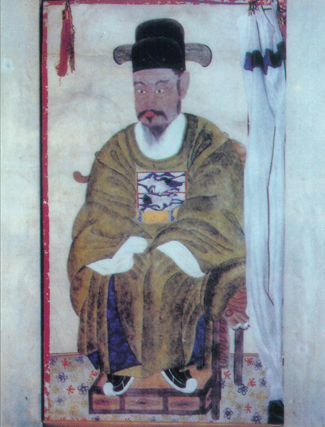
Deputy Marshal O Yŏnch'ong

Ch'ŏk fought in the wars against the Eastern Jurchens on Goryeo's northeastern border. In 1104, after the defeat of the Goryeo army led by Im Kan (임간; 林幹) to the forces of the Eastern Jurchens, Ch'ŏk Chun'gyŏng asked Im for a weapon and an armoured horse. Ch'ŏk rode into the enemy camp and slew one of the enemy commanders, and killed with his bow two more enemy commanders who tried to pursue him as he returned from the Jurchen camp. Ch'ŏk's act was able to allow the defeated remnants of the Goryeo army to retreat from the battlefield. Ch'ŏk was rewarded with an appointment as the Ch'onuwi recorder adjutant (천우위녹사 참군사; 千牛衛錄事參軍事). At some point, Ch'ŏk committed a crime, but general Yun Kwan recognized Ch'ŏk's martial talents and got the royal court to release Ch'ŏk from jail.

In 1108, he served under general Yun during Yun's invasion of the Jurchens. On January 18, 1108, (Note: In the Korean calendar (lunisolar), the 4th day of the 12th Lunar month of the 2nd year of Yejong's reign (1107).) Yun began the war against the Jurchens. He invited prominent Jurchen chiefs to a banquet and got them drunk. Yun had Ch'ŏk and Kim Pup'il ambush and kill the Jurchen chiefs. On January 29, (Note: In the Korean calendar (lunisolar), the 15th day of the 12th Lunar month of the 2nd year of Yejong's reign (1107).) Yun, Ch'ŏk and the Goryeo army reached Sŏksŏng (석성; 石城). The Jurchen defenders refused to surrender and Goryeo army faced stiff resistance. Yun asked Ch'ŏk to attack the fort alongside General Yi Kwanjin (이관진; 李冠珍). Ch'ŏk instead told Yun that he would repay Yun's favour in releasing him from prison even if it meant losing his life. He then put on his armour and took a shield, and scaled the walls of the fort, killing several of the Jurchen chiefs. This allowed for Yun Kwan to conquer the fort. On February 27, (Note: In the Korean calendar (lunisolar), the 14th day of the 1st Lunar month of the 3rd year of Yejong's reign (1108).) Yun Kwan and his deputy commander, O Yŏnch'ong (오연총; 吳延寵), and their force of 8000 men were ambushed by a Jurchen surprise attack. Most of the Goryeo army dispersed with only around 10 soldiers remaining alongside Yun and O. O was hit by an arrow and was severely injured. Ch'ŏk Chun'gyŏng took 10 men to aid Yun and O. Ch'ŏk Chun'gyŏng's younger brother, Ch'ŏk Chunsin (척준신; 拓俊臣), attempted to persuade Ch'ŏk Chun'gyŏng to not risk his life, however Ch'ŏk Chun'gyŏng refused to heed his brother's advice. Ch'ŏk and his men killed 10 enemy combatants and helped Yun and O fend the Jurchen ambushers until Goryeo reinforcements led by Ch'oe Hongjŏng (최홍정; 崔弘正) and Yi Kwanjin arrived. When the Jurchens lifted the ambush, Ch'ŏk pursued them and beheaded 36 Jurchen soldiers. Yun Kwan told Ch'ŏk that he would now regard Ch'ŏk as if he were his own son. For his contributions during the war, Ch'ŏk was promoted to the office of audience usher (합문지후; 閤門祗候; hammunjihu) and an assistant office chief of the Ministry of Works (공부원외랑; 工部員外郎) by the end of the war in 1109. These promotions would have taken an ordinary civil official ten years, however Ch'ŏk as a military official had only been promoted after a period of around two years.

=== Rise and Fall in the Royal Court ===
Ch'ŏk Chun'gyŏng would forge a strong personal relationship with Yi Chagyŏm, a powerful Goryeo aristocrat of the Inju Yi clan. Yi Chagyŏm and his clan were the maternal in-laws of Goryeo's royal House of Wang, and he had more power and influence than the king himself. Yi would help promote Ch'ŏk and his relatives to high-ranking offices in the royal court, in exchange for Ch'ŏk's loyalty and influence over the Goryeo military. Ch'ŏk would strengthen this bond by becoming in-laws with Yi by marrying his daughter to Yi's son, Yi Chiwŏn. In 1123, Ch'ŏk was appointed the minister of personnel (이부상서; 吏部尙書; ibusangsŏ) and the assistant executive in political affairs (참지정사; 參知政事; ch'amjijŏngsa). On January 20, 1126, (Note: In the Korean calendar (lunisolar), the 25th day of the 12th Lunar month of the 3nd year of Injong's reign (1125).) Ch'ŏk would be promoted to the vice-director of the Chancellery (문하시랑평장사; 門下侍郎平章事; munhasirangp'yŏngjangsa).

On March 20, 1126, (Note: In the Korean calendar (lunisolar), the 25th day of the 2nd Lunar month of the 4th year of Injong's reign (1126).) loyalists of King Injong attempted to assassinate Yi Chagyŏm and Ch'ŏk Chun'gyŏng and remove their influence on the government. The conspirators seized the royal palace, and killed Ch'ŏk's brother and son. However, they were unable to kill Ch'ŏk or Yi. During the night, the angered Ch'ŏk, without consulting his ally Yi, burned the royal palace to the ground to force the conspirators to surrender. On May 9 , (Note: In the Korean calendar (lunisolar), the 15th day of the 4th Lunar month of the 4th year of Injong's reign (1126).) Ch'ŏk was rewarded for suppressing the conspirators with the office of the Superintendent of the Ministry of Military Affairs and the Executive of Secretariat-Chancellery (문하시랑 판병부사; 門下侍郞 判兵部事), giving him command of the armed forces.

The remaining aristocratic rivals of Yi Chagyŏm and Ch'ŏk Chun'gyŏng plotted to overthrow them by turning them against each other. The schemers convinced Ch'ŏk Chun'gyŏng to betray his ally Yi. Three months after the assassination plot had been foiled, Ch'ŏk and his soldiers would arrest Yi Chagyŏm and his political allies. Yi was sent into exile. However, just a year later in 1127, Ch'ŏk himself was impeached from his offices by Chŏng Chisang (정지상; 鄭知常) and sent into exile. Ch'ŏk died in 1144.
