= Princess Jangsin =

Goryeo concubine (fl. 12th century)

Suk-bi Choe 숙비 최씨

Dowager consort of Goryeo
- Tenure: 1129–1184?
- Coronation: 1129
- Monarch: King Injong (stepson); King Myeongjong (step-grandson)
- Died: 1184; Goryeo
- Spouse: Yejong of Goryeo (m. 1121; died 1122)
- Issue: Wang Gak-gwan
Names
- Princess Jangsin (장신궁주, 長信宮主; given in c.1121 by King Yejong); Royal Consort Suk of the Choe clan (숙비 최씨, 淑妃 崔氏; given in 1129 by King Injong)
- House: Haeju Choe (by birth); House of Wang (by marriage)
- Father: Choe Yong
- Mother: Lady Gim

Royal Consort Suk of the Haeju Choe clan (Korean: 숙비 최씨; Hanja: 淑妃 崔氏; lit. 'Pure Consort of the Haeju Choe clan'; d. 1184), also known as Princess Jangsin (장신궁주; 長信宮主) was a Korean royal consort as the fourth wife of King Yejong of Goryeo.

== Biography ==
=== Early life ===
Lady Choe was born as the third daughter of Choe Yong and Lady Kim, into the Haeju Choe clan (해주 최씨; 海州 崔氏). Her father was a great-grandson of Choe Chung (최충). She had eight brothers and four sisters.

=== Marriage and later life ===
In 1121, King Yejong decided to make Lady Choe his concubine and she entered the palace not long after that. She then given the royal title of Princess Jangsin (장신궁주; 長信宮主) and gave birth to a son, Wang Gak-gwan.

On 1129, she was honoured as Suk-bi (숙비; 淑妃; "Pure Consort") by King Injong, her husband's only son by his second wife. In 1144 (22nd year reign of King Injong), Lady Suk-bi's father was granted the title Susagong (수사공).

The widowed consort died in 1184, during the 14th year of King Myeongjong's reign. The location of her tomb is unknown.
