= Princess Seungdeok =

Princess of Goryeo (fl. 12th century)

Princess Seungdeok 승덕공주
- Born: 1128; Goryeo
- Died: Unknown
- Husband: Wang Ki (m. 1145); third cousin
- Issue: Wang Sŏng; Wang Pak; Wang P'yŏng
- House: Wang
- Father: Yejong of Goryeo
- Mother: Queen Sundeok of the Gyeongwon Yi clan

Princess Seungdeok (Korean: 승덕공주; Hanja: 承德公主; 1128 – ?) was a Goryeo Royal Princess as the first and oldest daughter of King Yejong and Queen Sundeok, also the first sister of King Injong.

== Biography ==
=== Early life ===
It seems that she was born in 1128 and was the paternal aunt of Uijong of Goryeo, Myeongjong of Goryeo and Sinjong of Goryeo. Her maternal grandfather was Yi Cha-gyŏm from the powerful Gyeongwon Yi clan. In 1124 (2nd year reign of her older brother), she was honoured as Princess Jang (장공주) and then married Wang Ki, Count Hannam (왕기 한남백). After her death, she was posthumously honoured Princess Seungdeok (승덕공주; 승덕궁주; 承德公主; 承德宮主).

=== Husband's families ===
Her husband, Wang Ki was the son of Wang Chŏng, Count Seunghwa (왕정 승화백) who was a grandson of King Jeonggan, one of King Hyeonjong's son. Ki's mother was Princess Heungsu (흥수궁주) who was actually Seungdeok's aunt. So, the princess and her husband were first cousins. Together, they had 3 sons and 1 daughter.

== Family ==
- Father: Yejong of Goryeo (1079–1122)
- Mother: Queen Sundeok of the Gyeongwon Yi clan (1094–1118)
- Husband (cousin): Wang Ki, Count Hannam ({1105 – ?)
  - Father-in-law (formerly uncle): Wang Chŏng, Count Seunghwa (왕정 승화백; 1088–1130)
  - Mother-in-law (formerly aunt): Princess Heungsu (흥수궁주; 1088–1123)
    - Son: Wang Sŏng, Marquess Sinan (왕성 신안후; 1146–1178) – became the father of Queen Wondeok.
    - Son: Wang Pak, Count Hamnyeong (왕박 함녕백; 1148–1185)
    - Son: Wang P'yŏng, Duke Yeonchang (왕평 연창공; 1150 – ?)
    - Daughter: Lady Wang (왕씨; 王氏; 1178 – ?)
