= Heonjong =

Heonjong may refer to:

- Heonjong of Goryeo, Korean king, r. 1094–1095
- Heonjong of Joseon, Korean king, r. 1834–1849
