= Princess Wonsin =

Princess Consort of Goryeo (fl. 11th century)

Princess Wonsin 원신궁주
- Spouse: Seonjong of Goryeo
- Issue: Wang Yun, Marquess Hansan
Regnal name
- Consort Wonhui (원희궁비; 元嬉宮妃)
- House: Gyeongwon Yi clan
- Father: Yi Chŏng (이정)
- Mother: Lady Wang of Sangdang County
- Religion: Buddhism

Princess Wonsin of the Gyeongwon Yi clan (Korean: 원신궁주 이씨; Hanja: 元信宮主 李氏) was the third wife of her first cousin, King Seonjong of Goryeo.

She firstly honoured as Consort Wonhui (원희궁비; 元嬉宮妃; lit. 'Consort of the Wonhui Palace'), but after her older brother, Yi Cha-ŭi (이자의) was executed by Duke Gyerim on the charge of plotting treason to make Wonhui's son as the new king instead of Gyerim, she was implicated in this and along with her son, they were exiled to Gyeongwon-gun (now in Incheon). In 1101, a pardon was issued for those who involved in the Yi Cha-ŭi case and after Crown Prince Wang U ascended the throne, the Gyeongwon Yi clan's people can gained their position again in the court and Yi Cha-gyŏm's daughter was chosen as the new queen consort for Yejong.
