= Li Zhaoyi =

Li Zhaoyi may refer to:

- Some of Consort Li who received the "zhaoyi" title:
  - Li Shunxian (c. 900–926), Iranian-born concubine of Former Shu's final emperor Wang Yan
  - Li Zhaoyi (d. 264), Chinese concubine of the Shu Han emperor, Liu Shan
  - Consort Yi (Ming dynasty) (1392–1421), known in Chinese as Consort Li, Korean-born concubine of the Yongle Emperor
- Li Zhaoyi (taekwondo) (born 1994)

== See also ==
- Li Chaoyi (1934–2018), Chinese neurobiologist
