= Prince Hansan =

Goryeo prince (fl. 11th century)

Marquess Hansan 한산후
- Prince of Goryeo
- Born: Wang Yun; Goryeo
- House: House of Wang
- Father: Seonjong of Goryeo
- Mother: Princess Wonsin of the Incheon Yi clan
- Religion: Buddhism

- Marquess Hansan
- Hangul: 왕윤
- Hanja: 王昀
- RR: Wang Yun
- MR: Wang Yun

Royal title
- Hangul: 한산후
- Hanja: 漢山侯
- RR: Hansanhu
- MR: Hansanhu

Marquess Hansan (Korean: 한산후; Hanja: 漢山侯), personal name Wang Yun (Korean: 왕윤; Hanja: 王昀) was a Korean Royal Prince as the only son of Seonjong of Goryeo and Princess Wonsin. Around 1094 (30th days 6th months in the Korean calendar (lunisolar)), Wang Yun appointed as Susado (수사도; 守司徒) along with Wang Yu and Wang Yeong upon King Heonjong's ascension to the throne.

== Biography ==
Born into the Goryeo royal family, he was the second son of King Seonjong, from Princess Wonsin who was one of Yi Ja-yeon's granddaughter and initially first cousin to her husband since Seonjong's mother was her aunt. He was then named as Wang Yun (왕윤) or sometimes spelled Wang Gyun (왕균).

In 1094, Crown Prince Wang Uk ascended the throne, but since he was too young at this time, his mother, Queen Sasuk executed the government affairs instead. However, the political situation remained unstable. Taking advantage of the young king's poor health, the powerful nobleman Yi Ja-ui (이자의), Wang Yun's maternal uncle, conspired to place his nephew on the throne. The plot was discovered by another of Wang Yun's uncles, Duke Gyerim (later Sukjong of Goryeo). At this time, Yi gathered his peoples and said,

"The current King (Heonjong) is ill and there are people spying on the throne from outside the palace. They gathered soldiers in the palace and tried to make a big deal out of it."
"지금의 임금(헌종)은 병이 있어 궁궐 바깥에서 왕위를 엿보는 자가 있으니, 너희들은 한산후를 받들어 신기)를 다른 이에게 가지 못하게 하라. 궁궐에 군사를 모아놓고 거사를 일으키려고 하였다."

Meanwhile, Gyerim soon noticed this and informed So Tae-bo (소태보) about this, which So brought troops to the palace along with Wang Guk-mo (왕국모). In 1095, Gyerim purged Yi's faction on charges of plotting a rebellion by murdered him and then ascended the throne as King Sukjong passed his nephew. As a result, Wang Yun was exiled to Gyeongwon-gun [Gyeongwon County] (now in Incheon along with his mother not long after that. There were no records left about Wang Yun's life this.
