= Royal Consort Jeongsin Hyeon-Bi =

Korean royal consort (fl. 11th century)

Worthy Consort Jeongsin 정신현비

Queen consort of Goryeo
- Tenure: ?–?
- Predecessor: Queen Inye
- Successor: Queen Sasuk
- Spouse: Seonjong of Goryeo
- Issue: Princess Yeonhwa
Posthumous name
- Jeongsin (정신, 貞信; "Chaste and Veritable")
- House: Incheon Yi (by birth); House of Wang (by marriage)
- Father: Yi Ye

Royal Consort Jeongsin of the Incheon Yi clan (Korean: 정신현비 이씨; Hanja: 貞信賢妃 李氏; lit. 'Worthy Consort Jeongsin of the Incheon Yi clan') was a Korean queen consort and the first wife of King Seonjong of Goryeo, her second cousin. She was the second Goryeo queen consort who didn't receive a posthumous name like the other queen consorts following Lady Wang.

She was the daughter of Yi Ye (이예), son of Yi Ja-sang (이자상) and younger brother of Yi Ja-yeon (이자연). It seems that she married Seonjong when he was still "Duke Gukwon" (국원공) and then became "Duchess Consort Gukwon" (국원공비; 國原公妃) while lived in his manor. Although she was the first wife, but she didn't lived long and bore him a daughter who later became Yejong of Goryeo's first wife. In 1107, her son-in-law tried to orient himself at Seonjong's tomb, but was not accomplished due to the opposition from his officials.
