= Jinju So clan =

Korean clan from South Gyeongsang Province

- Country: Korea
- Current region: Jinju
- Founder: So Gyeong
- Connected members: Queen Hoesun; Alcheon; So Yoo-jin; So Ji-sub; So Joo-yeon; So Jung-hwan

Jinju So clan (Korean: 진주 소씨; Hanja: 晉州 蘇氏) was one of the Korean clans. Their Bon-gwan was in Jinju, South Gyeongsang Province. According to the research in 2015, the number of Jinju So clan was 50,357. So Baek-son, a 130th descendant, built Jinhan confederacy. After that, So Gyeong, a 29th descendant of So Baek-son, began Jinju So clan when he served as a government official in Goryeo.

== See also ==
- Hyeokgeose of Silla
