= Queen Seonpyeong =

Queen Seonpyeong 선평왕후
- Died: 1179; Goryeo
- Spouse: Injong of Goryeo (m. 1127; died 1146)
Regnal name
- Secondary Consort (차비; 次妃; given in 1127 upon her marriage with King Injong); Royal Dowager Consort (왕태비; 王太妃; given after King Uijong's ascension) or simplified as Dowager Consort (태비; 太妃); Princess Yeonsu (연수궁주; 延壽宮主)
Posthumous name
- Seonpyeong (선평, 宣平; "Responsible and Peaceful")
- House: _{disputed between Gyeongju or Gangneung} Gim (by birth); House of Wang (by marriage)
- Father: Gim Seon (김선)

Queen Seonpyeong of the Gim clan (Korean: 선평왕후 김씨; Hanja: 宣平王后 金氏; d. 1179) was the older sister of Gim Yi-yeong (김이영) who became the fourth wife of King Injong of Goryeo upon their marriage in 1127. She was treated well even after his death by became the Princess Yeonsu (연수궁주; 延壽宮主) and Dowager Consort (왕태비; 王太妃) which was little lower than a queen mother since his successors were all came from Queen Im, who became the queen dowager. Meanwhile, she was later died in 1179 (9th years reign of King Myeongjong) and received her posthumous name, Seonpyeong (선평; 宣平).

== In popular culture ==
- Portrayed by Kim Bo-mi in the 2003–4 KBS TV series Age of Warriors.
