= Queen Hoesun =

Queen Hoesun 회순왕후
- Queen consort of Goryeo _{(disputed)}
- Spouse: Heonjong of Goryeo
- House: Jinju So (by birth); House of Wang (by marriage)
- Father: So Gye-ryeong, Internal Prince Jinsan
- Religion: Buddhism

Queen Hoesun of the Jinju So clan (Korean: 회순왕후 소씨; Hanja: 懷純王后 蘇氏) was presumed as the queen consort of Goryeo through her marriage with King Heonjong of Goryeo. It was disputed whether she was Heonjong's wife or just added in Jinju So clan's records since all of her existence didn't appear in the Goryeosa.
