= Queen Gyeonghwa =

Princess of Goryeo (1079–1109)

Queen Gyeonghwa 경화왕후

Princess of Goryeo
- Reign: ?–1106
- Successor: Princess Suan
- Monarch: Wang Un, King Seonjong

Queen consort of Goryeo
- Tenure: 1106–1109
- Coronation: 1106
- Predecessor: Queen Myeongui
- Successor: Queen Sundeok
- Born: 1079; Goryeo
- Died: 1109 (aged about 30/1); Goryeo
- Burial: Jareung tomb
- Spouse: Yejong of Goryeo (m. 1106–1109)
Regnal name
- Princess Yeonhwa (연화공주; 延和公主)
Posthumous name
- Gyeonghwa (경화, 敬和; "Respectful and Harmonious")
- House: House of Wang (by birth); Incheon Yi (by marriage)
- Father: Seonjong of Goryeo
- Mother: Worthy Consort Jeongsin of the Incheon Yi clan

Queen Gyeonghwa of the Incheon Yi clan (Korean: 경화왕후 이씨; Hanja: 敬和王后 李氏; 1079–1109) was a Goryeo princess and the only daughter of King Seonjong and Consort Jeongsin. Queen Gyeonghwa became a queen consort through her marriage with her first cousin, King Yejong as his first and primary wife, with which she became the 11th reigned Goryeo queen who followed her maternal clan after Queen Inpyeong. She was called Princess Yeonhwa (Korean: 연화공주; Hanja: 延和公主) when she was still a child/princess.

She then followed her mother's clan, the Incheon Yi and married in 1106, along with she whom formally became Yejong's queen. Beside their relationship before as a first cousin, Yejong was said to love her very much since her appearance and attitude were clear and extraordinary, beautiful. However, she later died at 31 years of age in 1109 and Yejong was said to be very sad about this. He buried her in Jareung Tomb (자릉; 慈陵) and gave her posthumous name.
