= Incheon Lee clan =

Korean noble clan

Incheon Lee clan Gyeongwon Yi clan, Inju Yi clan
- Country: North and South Korea
- Current region: Incheon
- Origin: Geumgwan Gaya, present-day South Korea
- Founder: Yi Hŏ-gyŏm
- Connected members: Lee Seung-u; Yi Cha-gyŏm; Yi Cha-yŏn; Queen Inye; Royal Consort Ingyeong; Royal Consort Injeol; Yi Sŏk; Princess Janggyeong; Royal Consort Jeongsin; Queen Sasuk; Princess Wonsin; Queen Sundeok; Princess Yeondeok; Princess Bokchang
- Website: http://iclee.or.kr/

The Incheon Lee clan (Korean: 인천 이씨; Hanja: 仁川 李氏) is a Korean clan. Historically known as the Gyeongwon Yi clan or Inju Yi clan, it was one of the most powerful clans in the early Goryeo period due to their status as in-laws of the ruling House of Wang. According to the 2015 South Korean census, there were 83,855 members of this clan.

== Name and origin ==
An ancestor of the clan, a 23rd generation descendant of King Suro and Heo Hwang-ok, was Hŏ Ki (허기; 許奇). He was sent to Tang China as an ambassador of Silla. Emperor Xuanzong bestowed the surname "Yi" on Hŏ Ki because he helped him escape from the An Lushan Rebellion. When Yi Hŏ-ki (이허기; 李許奇) returned to Silla, King Gyeongdeok awarded him the title of "Prince of Soseong" (邵城伯).

Later, Yi Hŏ-gyŏm, a 10th generation descendant of Yi Hŏ-ki and the grandfather of Queen Wonseong, began the Incheon Lee clan.

== Dominance in early Goryeo ==
The Gyeongwon Lee clan was thought to have been local aristocrats or hojok from Gyeongwon County (modern-day Incheon). The clan was able to use their marriage ties to the Ansan Kim clan, who were in-laws to the royal family, to become royal in-laws themselves. Yi Cha-yŏn, the grandson of Hŏ-gyŏm, married his three daughters to King Munjong. One of those three, Queen Inye, became the mother of three kings, Sunjong, Seonjong, and Sukjong.

From 981 to 1146, the Gyeongwon Lee clan had 27 officials in the central bureaucracy, 12 of whom were first or second grade officials. This was more than any other clan in during that time period.

In 1095, Yi Cha-ŭi, attempted to replace King Heonjong with his nephew, Wang Kyun. However, Prince Gyerim (later King Sukjong) and his allies killed Yi Cha-ŭi on August 29, 1095 before it could happen.

The family reached the peak of its power during the time of Yi Cha-gyŏm. Yi Cha-gyŏm married his daughter to King Yejong, who produced a son who would be later become King Injong. King Injong was enthroned as the next king with the aid of Yi Cha-gyŏm. He married his two other daughters to King Injong, becoming both his maternal grandfather and father-in-law. Yi Cha-gyŏm used his ties to the royal House of Wang to influence the court and purge his political opponents. Yi sought to depose King Yejong and take the throne for himself after seeing a prophecy that eighteen sons, meaning someone of the Yi surname would become king. The king attempted to stop the plot, however military forces under Yi's ally, Ch'ŏk Chun-gyŏng (척준경; 拓俊京) foiled the king's scheme. The royal library and palace were burned down, the king's close supporters were executed, and King Yejong himself was himself under house arrest. King Yejong was due to be poisoned to death by Yi. However, the king convinced Yi's ally, Ch'ŏk Chun-gyŏng, to switch sides and arrested Yi and sent him into exile in 1126.

== See also ==
- Yi Cha-gyŏm
