= Deposed Princess Bokchang =

Queen consort of Goryeo (died 1195)

Deposed Princess Bokchang 폐비 복창원주

Queen consort of Goryeo
- Tenure: 1125–1126 (deposed)
- Coronation: 1125
- Predecessor: Princess Yeondeok
- Successor: Queen Gongye
- Died: 27 November 1195; Goryeo
- Spouse: Injong of Goryeo (m. 1125–1126)
- House: Gyeongwon Yi clan
- Father: Yi Cha-gyŏm
- Mother: Lady Ch'oe

Deposed Princess Bokchang of the Gyeongwon Yi clan (Korean: 폐비 복창원주 이씨; Hanja: 廢妃 福昌院主 李氏; d. 27 November 1195) was a Korean queen consort and the 2nd wife of her nephew, King Injong of Goryeo. She was the youngest, among Queen Sundeok (oldest sister who becomes mother-in-law) and Princess Yeondeok, also the last Goryeo queen who came from the powerful Gyeongwon Yi clan.

== Biography ==
On 1st month 1125 (lunar calendar), she entered the palace at a young age. According to the Tongguk t'onggam, it rained a lot, the wind blew strong and the trees were uprooted on the day she entered the palace like her second elder sister who had already entered the Palace.

In order to poison Injong, her father served him a poisoned Tteok (떡), but she instead secretly informed the king about this. Then, Injong's servants threw this rice-cake to the raven and while it ate this, it died not long after that. After it known that the plan failed, Yi Cha-gyŏm tried another plan and ordered her to gave a poison to the king, but she didn't hear her father, deliberately slipped and spilled the poison while carrying it.

In 1126 (4th year reign of Injong), her father was ousted and after that, some of Injong's servants said:

"The Princess can't be the king's queen consort as she was closely relative from his maternal side"
(궁주는 왕의 종모(從母)이니 왕후가 될 수 없다).

Alongside her second older sister, they were deposed from her position and became Lady Yi (이씨). Even after her deposition, she was honoured as Princess Bokchang (복창원주; 福昌院主; lit. 'Lady of the Bokchang Mansion') and given land, house, maids while received preferential treatment in consideration of her past efforts to save Injong. King Uijong and King Myeongjong, Injong's successors still respected and treated her sincerely. Later, in winter 1195, she died.
