= Seonjong of Goryeo =

King of Goryeo from 1083 to 1094

Seonjong 선종 宣宗

King of Goryeo
- Reign: 1083–1094
- Coronation: 1083; Sajeong Hall, Gaegyeong, Goryeo
- Predecessor: Sunjong of Goryeo
- Successor: Heonjong of Goryeo
- Born: Wang Jeung/Gi; 9 October 1049; Gaegyeong, Goryeo
- Died: 17 June 1094 (aged 44); Yeonyeong Hall, Gaegyeong, Goryeo
- Burial: Illeung (인릉; 仁陵)
- Queen Consort: Consort Jeongsin Queen Sasuk (before 1083)
- Consort: Princess Wonsin
- Issue: Sons: Heonjong of Goryeo Marquess Hansan 2 unnamed princes; Daughters: Princess Yeonhwa Princess Suan Princess Wang
Posthumous name
- Great King Gwanin Hyeonsun Anseong Sahyo 관인현순안성사효대왕 (寬仁顯順安成思孝大王)
Temple name
- Seonjong (선종; 宣宗)
- House: Wang
- Dynasty: Goryeo
- Father: Munjong of Goryeo
- Mother: Queen Inye

- Korean name
- Hangul: 왕운
- Hanja: 王運
- RR: Wang Un
- MR: Wang Un

Monarch name
- Hangul: 선종
- Hanja: 宣宗
- RR: Seonjong
- MR: Sŏnjong

Courtesy name
- Hangul: 계천
- Hanja: 繼天
- RR: Gyecheon
- MR: Kyech'ŏn

Posthumous name
- Hangul: 사효대왕
- Hanja: 思孝大王
- RR: Sahyo daewang
- MR: Sahyo taewang

Former names
- Hangul: 왕증, 왕기
- Hanja: 王蒸, 王祈
- RR: Wang Jeung, Wang Gi
- MR: Wang Chŭng, Wang Ki

Seonjong (9 October 1049 – 17 June 1094) was the 13th king of the Korean Goryeo dynasty. He was the second son of Empress Inye and born in September, 1049. He was made Marquis of Gukwon (國原侯) in March 1056. Harmony of Confucism and Buddhism made his political statute very stable. Also he propelled broad-range trade among the Song dynasty, Liao dynasty, the Jurchens, and Japan.

During his period, Buddhism in Korea expanded greatly. His brother Uicheon brought 1,000 scriptures from the Song dynasty and bought 4,000 scriptures from the Liao dynasty, Song dynasty, and Japan. Furthermore, Seonjong founded many pagodas for Buddhist temples and presented clothing for soldiers guarding the borders. One of the most famous Buddhist temples in Korea, Yongamsa Temple on Mt. Jangji, was constructed during his reign after Seonjong dreamt of a Buddhist monk begging for foot.

== Family ==
- Father: Munjong of Goryeo
  - Grandfather: Hyeonjong of Goryeo
  - Grandmother: Queen Wonhye of the Ansan Kim clan
- Mother: Queen Inye of the Gyeongwon Yi clan
  - Grandfather: Yi Ja-yeon
  - Grandmother: Lady, of the Gyeongju Kim clan
- Consorts and their Respective issue(s):
1. Queen Sasuk of the Gyeongwon Yi clan; maternal first cousin.
  1. Crown Prince Wang Uk, 1st son
  2. Princess Suan, 2nd daughter
  3. 3rd daughter
2. Worthy Consort Jeongsin, of the Incheon Yi clan; maternal second cousin.
  1. Princess Yeonhwa, 1st daughter
3. Princess Wonsin of the Gyeongwon Yi clan; maternal first cousin.
  1. Wang Yun, Marquess Hansan, 2nd son
4. Unknown
  1. 3rd son
  2. 4th son

== See also ==
- List of Korean monarchs
- List of Goryeo people
- Goryeo

Seonjong of Goryeo House of Wang Born: 9 October 1049 Died: 17 June 1094
Regnal titles
| Preceded by Sunjong | King of Goryeo; 1083–1094 | Succeeded by Heonjong |
Korean royalty
| New creation | Marquis of Gukwon; 1056–1083 | Merged in the Crown |
