= Consort Yi (Ming dynasty) =

Ming dynasty concubine (1392–1421)

Lady of Bright Deportment Yi 李昭儀
- Born: 1392; Kingdom of Joseon
- Died: 1421 (aged 28–29); Beijing
- Spouse: Yongle Emperor
- Clan: Yi (이; 李)
- Father: Yi Mun-myeong (이문명; 李文明)

Consort Yi (1392–1421) was an imperial concubine of the Yongle Emperor.

She was from Korea, and became a member of the imperial harem of the Yongle Emperor in 1409. In 1421, she was one of the many concubines who were accused for having participated in a conspiracy to murder the emperor. She was arrested and interrogated. She was executed for attempted murder of the emperor.

== Titles ==
- During the reign of the Hongwu Emperor (r. 1368–1398):
  - Lady Yi (이씨, 李氏) (from 1392)
- During the reign of the Yongle Emperor (r. 1402–1424):
  - Gong-nyeo (공녀, 貢女) (from 1409)
  - Lady of Bright Deportment (昭儀; from 1409)
