= Deposed Princess Yeondeok =

Queen consort of Goryeo (died 1139)

Deposed Princess Yeondeok 폐비 연덕궁주

Queen consort of Goryeo
- Tenure: 1124–1126 (deposed)
- Coronation: 1124
- Predecessor: Queen Sundeok
- Successor: Princess Bokchang
- Died: 4 August 1139; Goryeo
- Spouse: Injong of Goryeo (m. 1124–1126)
- House: Gyeongwon Yi clan
- Father: Yi Cha-gyŏm
- Mother: Lady Ch'oe

Deposed Princess Yeondeok of the Gyeongwon Yi clan (Korean: 폐비 연덕궁주 이씨; Hanja: 廢妃 延德宮主 李氏; d. 4 August 1139) was a Korean queen consort as the 1st wife of her nephew, King Injong of Goryeo. It was said that she was possessed of beauty and gentleness, and an unblemished character. She was the second, alongside Queen Sundeok (initially older sister and later mother-in-law) and Princess Bokchang.

== Biography ==
Injong was afraid that Yeondeok's father, Yi Cha-gyŏm, who was the most powerful noble at that time, would give the throne to another prince, thus diluting and splitting power. Hoping to avoid this, Injong forced Yeondeok to become his Queen Consort.

In the 8th month of 1124 (Korean calendar; lunisolar), she formally become his Queen consort, entered the Palace, and was honoured as Princess Yeondeok (연덕궁주; 延德宮主). According to Tongguk t'onggam, on the day she became queen it rained a great deal, the wind blew strongly, and the trees were uprooted.

Meanwhile, on 20 June 1126 (4th year reign of Injong), Princess Yeondeok's father was ousted. Following this, some of Injong's servants said

"The Princess couldn't be the king's queen consort as she was a close relative from his maternal side"
(궁주는 왕의 종모(從母)이니 왕후가 될 수 없다)

Afterwards, she and her younger sister were deposed from their positions and became simply Lady Yi (이씨). Even after she was deposed, Injong, and other reigning kings, continued to treat generously. She died on 4 August 1139, without any children.
