= Heonjong of Goryeo =

King of Goryeo from 1094 to 1095

Heonjong 헌종 獻宗

King of Goryeo
- Reign: 1094–1095
- Coronation: 1094; Junggwang Hall, Kaegyŏng, Goryeo
- Predecessor: Seonjong of Goryeo
- Successor: Sukjong of Goryeo

Retired King of Goryeo
- Reign: 1095–1097
- Coronation: 1095
- Born: Wang Uk; 1 August 1084; Yeonhwa Palace, Kaegyŏng, Goryeo
- Died: 6 November 1097 (aged 13); Heungsang Palace, Kaegyŏng, Goryeo
- Burial: Eulleung (은릉; 隱陵)
- Spouse: Queen Hoesun (_{disputed})
Posthumous name
- Great King Jeongbi Gongsang 정비공상대왕 (定比恭殤大王)
- House: Wang
- Dynasty: Goryeo
- Father: Seonjong of Goryeo
- Mother: Queen Sasuk

Korean name
- Hangul: 왕욱
- Hanja: 王昱
- RR: Wang Uk
- MR: Wang Uk

Monarch name
- Hangul: 헌종
- Hanja: 獻宗
- RR: Heonjong
- MR: Hŏnjong

Heonjong (1 August 1084 – 6 November 1097), personal name Wang Uk, was the 14th monarch of the Goryeo dynasty of Korea. He was the eldest son of King Seonjong. According to the Goryeosa, he was a bright child and excelled in writing by the age of 9.

In the year of his accession, Heonjong was faced by the rebellion of Yi Cha-ui, which was quickly put down. In the following year, he fell ill and gave up the throne to King Sukjong, his uncle.

== See also ==
- List of Korean monarchs
- Goryeo
- History of Korea

Heonjong of Goryeo House of Wang Born: 1 August 1084 Died: 6 November 1097
Regnal titles
Preceded by Seonjong	King of Goryeo; 1094–1095	Succeeded by Sukjong
