= Queen Sundeok =

Korean queen (1094–1118)

Queen Sundeok 순덕왕후
- Grand Queen Mother Mungyeong (문경왕태후; 文敬王太后)

Queen consort of Goryeo
- Tenure: 1114–1118
- Coronation: 1114
- Predecessor: Queen Gyeonghwa
- Successor: Lady Yeondeok
- Born: 15 April 1094; Goryeo
- Died: 21 September 1118 (aged 24); Goryeo
- Burial: Sureung tomb
- Spouse: Yejong of Goryeo (m. 1108–1118)
- Issue: Injong of Goryeo; Princess Seungdeok; Princess Heunggyeong
Regnal name
- Princess Yeondeok (연덕궁주, 延德宮主; 1108–1114)
Posthumous name
- Queen Mother Mungyeong (문경태후; 文敬太后); Grand Queen Mother Jajeong Mungyeong (자정문경왕태후, 慈靖文敬王太后; given in 1140)
- House: Gyeongwon Yi clan
- Father: Yi Cha-gyŏm
- Mother: Lady Ch'oe of the Haeju Ch'oe clan

Queen Sundeok of the Gyeongwon Yi clan (Korean: 순덕왕후 이씨; Hanja: 順德王后 李氏; 15 April 1094 – 21 September 1118 (Note: In the Korean calendar (lunisolar), she was born on March 28, 1094, and died on September 5, 1118)) or formally called as Queen Mother Mungyeong (문경태후; 文敬太后), was a Korean Goryeo era queen consort as the second wife of Yejong of Goryeo and the mother of his successor, Injong of Goryeo.

== Biography ==
=== Early life ===
The future Queen Sundeok was born on 15 April 1094 as the second daughter of Yi Cha-gyŏm and Lady Ch'oe, the second daughter of Choe Sa-chu from the Haeju Choe clan. She had six brothers, one older sister, and two younger sisters. Since King Munjong's reign, the Gyeongwon Yi clan had already produced many queen consorts or wives for the Goryeo royal family, so it can be said that she came from a noble family.

=== Marriage and Palace life ===
She firstly entered the palace in 1108 (3rd year reign of Yejong of Goryeo) at 15 years old and was given the royal title as Princess Yeondeok (연덕궁주; 延德宮主) and was put to live in Yeondeok Palace (연덕궁; 延德宮). One year later, she gave birth to their first son, Wang Hae (the future King Injong) and when learning that the baby was a boy, the King sent an envoy to issue a decree and expressed his joy by giving her silverware (은기; 銀器), silk (비단), horses (말), wood (포목; 布木) and grain (곡식) while putting up a token (표; 表) to pay their respects on her.

In 1114, she formally became his queen consort. It was said after his first wife died, he was very sad and after marrying Lady Yi, he loved and favored her very much due to her docile, intelligent, wise, soft and gentle character. The marriage of Queen Sundeok and King Yejong greatly increased Yi Cha-gyom's authority(Queen Sundeoks Biological father). However, because King Yejong had strong royal authority, Yi Cha-gyom was unable to shake off his power and had to remain quiet.Her mother, Lady Ch'oe, was formally called as "Grand Lady of the Joseon State" (조선국대부인; 朝鮮國大夫人). While her grandmother, Lady Kim was formally called as "Grand Lady of the Tongui State" (통의국대부인; 通儀國大夫人).

According to Chaebongmun after entering the palace, she set an example of marital harmony, never made a private request and gave birth to a son for generations to come. She was also praised for her virtues as she took care of her husband by advising him to wake up when a rooster crows. While she was bedridden, Yejong, who was grieve-stricken, brought out medicine and food himself for the queen. However, she died at the age of 24 on 21 September 1118 due to her own illness, which caused Yejong to wept many times and even heard the admonition from her servants that he was too polite and agony. Her son Injong was only 7 years old at that time.

Besides Prince Wang Hae, they also had 2 daughters (Princess Seungdeok and Princess Heunggyeong).

=== Later life ===
Yejong personally enshrined and went out to Sinbong Gate (신봉문; 神鳳門) to see her funeral procession in Sureung Tomb (수릉, 綏陵) even though the officials told him not to do that.

For in memory of her, the King was said to prepare a private room (혼당; 魂堂) to enshrined her portrait at Anhwa Temple (안화사; 安和寺) and always visited between February and August in the following year, while also visiting their Wedding Hall several times. The king went there again to bow down, to which the officials strongly discouraged him, but he chose to go against them and said,

"The memorial ceremonies were even held by the Song Dynasty's ruler. I just imitated it! Also, what's going to happen if I go to the wedding hall once?"
"조제의 예식은 송나라 임금도 한 적 있다. 나는 그 일을 본받은 것 뿐이다! 그리고 혼당 한번 간다고 무슨 큰일이 나는가?"

While also saying that he did what he wanted to do.

In 1120, after finishing the mourning of the queen, Yejong summoned the Crown Prince, his father-in-law and land governor Yi Cha-ryang to be comforted and to gave him goods.

After her husband's death in 1146, their only son, Wang Hae ascended the throne and married her younger sisters, which made two of them become her sisters and daughter in-laws at the same time. Their brothers were all occupied one place, respectively at the time of Injong's reign. However, after their father, Yi Cha-gyŏm's deposition and exiled, her two younger sisters were deposed from their position too as a result.

=== Posthumous name ===
After her death, she was posthumously honoured as Queen Sundeok (순덕왕후; 順德王后) and Grand Queen Mother Mungyeong (문경왕태후; 文敬王太后) after her only son ascended the throne in 1122.

- In 1140, name Ja-jeong (자정; 慈靖) was added to her posthumous name.

In her father's record on Goryeosa, she was called as an "Empress consort" (황후; 皇后).

=== Benefits for Gyeongwon Yi clan ===
Queen Sundeok, a woman born into the highest aristocratic family of that time, was chosen to become the Queen consort and Mother of the nation. She gave birth to a son who later ascended the throne and received a lot love and affection from her husband, which can be said that she lived a faithful life to the virtues demanded of her time. But, their marriage greatly enhanced the authority of Yi Cha-gyŏm and the King's favor towards her also became the source of interest and power for Yi who later tried to rebel.

== Family ==
- Father - Yi Cha-gyŏm (? – 19 January 1127)
  - Aunt - Princess Janggyeong
    - Uncle - Wang Hun, Sunjong of Goryeo (28 December 1047 – 5 December 1083)
- Mother - Grand Lady Byeon of the Haeju Choe clan (변한국대부인 최씨; 卞韓國大夫人 崔氏)
- Siblings
  - Brother - Yi Chi-mi (이지미; 李之美)
  - Brother - Yi Kong-ŭi (이공의; 李公儀)
  - Brother - Yi Chi-ŏn (이지언; 李之彦)
  - Brother - Yi Chi-bo (이지보; 李之甫)
  - Brother - Yi Chi-yun (이지윤; 李之允)
  - Brother - Yi Chi-wŏn (이지원; 李之元)
  - Older sister - Lady Yi of the Gyeongwon Yi clan (인천 이씨; 仁川李氏)
  - Younger sister - Deposed Princess Yeondeok (? – 29 August 1139)
  - Younger sister - Deposed Royal Lady Bokchang (? – 30 December 1195)
- Husband - Wang U, Yejong of Goryeo (11 February 1079 – 15 May 1115)
  - Father-in-law - Wang Eung, Sukjong of Goryeo (2 September 1054 – 10 November 1105)
  - Mother-in-law - Queen Myeongui of the Chŏngju Yu clan (? – 8 August 1112)
- Issue
  - Son - Wang Hae, Injong of Goryeo (29 October 1109 – 10 April 1146)
  - Daughter - Princess Seungdeok
  - Daughter - Princess Heunggyeong (? – 1176)
