= Yejong of Goryeo =

King of Goryeo from 1105 to 1122

Yejong; 예종; 睿宗

King of Goryeo
- Reign: 1105–1122
- Coronation: 1105: Junggwang Hall, Gaegyeong, Goryeo
- Predecessor: Sukjong of Goryeo
- Successor: Injong of Goryeo
- Born: Wang U 11 February 1079; Gaegyeong, Goryeo
- Died: 15 May 1122 (aged 43); Seonjeong Hall, Gaegyeong, Goryeo
- Burial: Yureung (유릉; 裕陵)
- Queen Consort: Queen Gyeonghwa (m. 1106; died 1109); Queen Sundeok (m. 1108; died 1118)
- Consort: Noble Consort Wang (m. 1121–1122); Pure Consort Choe (m. 1121–1122); Lady Eun; Lady An
- Issue: Sons: Wang Chi-in; Wang Hae; Wang Kak-gwan; Daughters: Princess Seungdeok; Princess Heunggyeong; A daughter
Posthumous name
- Great King Myeongnyeol Jesun Munhyo; 명렬제순문효대왕; (明烈齊順文孝大王)
Temple name
- Yejong (예종; 睿宗)
- House: Wang
- Dynasty: Goryeo
- Father: Sukjong of Goryeo
- Mother: Queen Myeongui

- Korean name
- Hangul: 왕우
- Hanja: 王俁
- RR: Wang U
- MR: Wang U

Monarch name
- Hangul: 예종
- Hanja: 睿宗
- RR: Yejong
- MR: Yejong

Courtesy name
- Hangul: 세민
- Hanja: 世民
- RR: Semin
- MR: Semin

Posthumous name
- Hangul: 문효대왕
- Hanja: 文孝大王
- RR: Munhyo daewang
- MR: Munhyo taewang

Yejong (11 February 1079 – 15 May 1122), personal name Wang U, was the 16th king of the Korean Goryeo dynasty. He was the eldest son of King Sukjong and Queen Myeongui, and succeeded to the throne upon his father's death. His reign is usually described as one of the most splendid periods of Goryeo, during which the arts and philosophy flourished, and military strengthening policies were implemented to ensure border security.

== Early years ==
Yejong was born Wang U in 1079, the thirty-third year of his grandfather King Munjong's reign. He was the eldest son of King Sukjong, who took the throne in 1095 after a coup against King Heonjong, and of Queen Myeongui. He was made crown prince in 1100, aged 21, and became king in 1105 when Sukjong died returning from Jangnak Palace in Seogyeong.

== Foreign relations ==
As soon as he ascended the throne, Yejong found himself having to face the conflict with the Jurchens that broke out during his father's reign. By the end of the eleventh century, the Wanyan tribe had begun to gain more power, leading to a fluctuation in the balances in Northeast Asia, and increasingly unstable relations with Goryeo, although they were initially part of Balhae in Manchuria and northern Korea's territories, and traced their descent from Goguryeo, referring to Goryeo as "father and mother country" and having particularly close contacts with its court.

During Sukjong's reign, Goryeo had faced the Jurchens in two battles that ended in defeats. The main cause was identified in the composition of the Korean army, whose strength was the infantry, against the enemy's cavalry; it was therefore reorganized into the Byeolmuban army (별무반; 別武班) to prepare for a large-scale war, which, however, did not take place due to the death of Sukjong. Goryeo and Jurchen maintained peaceful relations, but, after the period of mourning, Yejong decided to continue his father's work: when, in October 1107, the news that the Jurchens had invaded the North-Eastern border arrived to the court, an army of 170,000 men was mobilized, led by General Yun Kwan (1040–1111). Within two months, Yun occupied the Hamhŭng plains and advanced into the Tumen basin; in April 1108, they completed the construction of nine forts to control the area, and measures were implemented to prevent the Jurchens from moving into the territory and finding supplies, but, due to incorrect geographic information, the Goryeo army found itself trapped in the forts and surrounded by the enemy. The Jurchens asked that the nine forts be handed over and that a peace agreement be reached, and in May 1109 Yejong decided to accept, considering that in the meantime the Korean territory had been hit by famine and disease. Goryeo agreed to pay tribute to the Jurchens and withdrew all troops.

From 994, Goryeo had been a tributary state of Khitan Liao, which was a dominant power in the region, and had consequently adopted its calendar and its official era names. As not to antagonize Liao, the relations with Song China had been conducted discreetly, but were resumed in 1062, and more frequently, with the decline of Liao's power, also signaled by the fact that Liao no longer collected tributes after 1054. Following the defeat to the Jurchens, Goryeo cultivated its relations with Song, while taking a neutral stance between the Jurchens and Liao.

In 1114 Yejong sent a request to Huizong asking for Chinese musical instruments to be sent to his palace in Gaeseong, so that he could conduct Confucian rituals. Huizong, apparently misunderstanding the request, sent a set of musical instruments to be used for royal banquet music. The gift included 167 instruments and 20 volumes of music and performance instructions.

The following year, the Jurchen leader Wanyan Aguda proclaimed the establishment of the Jin dynasty with himself as its first emperor, Taizu. Liao asked Goryeo for help, but the request was refused because the view of the majority of Yejong's officials was that the Jurchens were going to emerge victorious and Liao would fall soon.

In 1116 a large embassy was dispatched to the Song court, while the second gift of musical instruments, consisting of 428 pieces had arrived, as well as ritual dance accessories and manuals, starting Korea's tradition of aak. Together with the gifts came a request to bring the Jurchen representatives to the Song court. It was declined, and Yejong warned Huizong not to deal with the Jurchens, because they "were like tigers and wolves". Trade and official contacts continued: in 1117 Song established a special office to deal with Goryeo merchants and envoys; furthermore, a large Chinese mission arrived in 1122, including the Confucian scholar Xu Jing (1091–1153), whose notes are an important source of information about the period.

In 1117, the Goryeo army advanced to Ŭiju area at the Yalu River, reconquered the territory and established new military headquarters there. That same year, Taizu sent an ambassador with a letter to Yejong asking to be recognized as "elder brother". Majority of the officials opposed this request and even considered beheading the envoy, but in the end it was decided not to answer.

== Support to education and religion ==
In July 1109, two months after yielding the nine forts to the Jurchens, Yejong introduced to Gukjagam, the National Academy, seven courses of study based on the Five Classics, the Rites of Zhou, and military studies. In 1116, he created academic institutions and libraries such as Cheongyeongak (청연각; 淸讌閣) and Bomungak (보문각; 寶文閣), and in 1119 he established the scholarship foundation Yanghyeongo (양현고; 養賢庫; lit. 'Foundation for the training of talents').

Although interested in education and culture already upon his accession to the throne, the sovereign identified several advantages in this policy: firstly, government education had long since been outclassed by the prosperity of private schools, but the reform introduced by Yejong gave way to a turnaround that continued into the reign of his successor; moreover, it was a way to strengthen his own authority, damaged by the failure against the Jurchens.

Yejong had an interest in Buddhism and Taoism, and supported them throughout his reign, also being guided by geomancy in pursuing the royal building policies. The boundaries between religious beliefs were blurred: in 1106 the king officiated a Taoist ritual in honor of the Supreme Being and at the same time offered sacrifices to King Taejo asking for rain.

Yejong expended considerable effort to promote Taoism: for instance, he ordered the teaching of the Daodejing (道德經), actively imported Taoist elements and ideas from the Song dynasty. In 1110, the Song emperor sent some ambassadors and two priests to Goryeo to instruct the people on Taoism, and that same year Yejong began the seven-year long construction of the country's first Taoist temple, Bogwongung (복원궁; 福源宮). He also renovated existing temples and religious institutions, and maintained cordial relations with the Confucian scholar, later a Taoist hermit, Kwak Yeo (1058–1130), often inviting him to the palace, asking for advice and exchanging poems.

== Economic and administrative reforms ==
Sukjong had introduced the use of bronze coins and a silver currency called eunbyeong (은병; 銀甁). As soon as he ascended the throne, Yejong had to confront the opposing bureaucracy, which still adhered to a barter economy and taxation in kind established by the dynasty's founder Taejo, popular sentiments and the underdevelopment of markets. The sovereign tried to defend the use of the currency by noting that Liao had also introduced it, but the ministers brought the Ten Injunctions of Taejo in support of their reasons, stating that the founder had warned against adopting foreign customs and traditions. Yejong replied that Taejo's warning was directed at extravagant and unnecessary spending, and insisted on the monetary policy, but ultimately the coins failed to spread on a large scale; the silver currency was instead used continuously until the end of the dynasty, mainly by the nobles.

In the years 1109, 1110, 1117 and 1120, Goryeo was hit by famine, epidemics and several natural disasters. To respond to the damage caused and social changes, including the emergency of displaced farmers, the government reorganized the local administration, taxation and labor system, implementing agricultural promotion policies such as the cultivation of military lands (군인전; 軍人田; gun-injeon) and abandoned lands. In 1112, the Hyeminguk (혜민국; 惠民局) was born for the free distribution of medicines to the poor, and in 1113 the Yeuisangjeongso (예의상정소; 禮儀詳定所; lit. 'Court of etiquette') was established to define new rules for clothing, etiquette and document management.

== Later years and succession ==
In the latter period of his reign, Yejong focused on strengthening the position of the crown prince Wang Hae. Mindful of what happened with his father Sukjong, who had ascended the throne by carrying out a coup d'état against the eleven-year-old King Heonjong, he considered the need to support the crown prince with a strong power to prevent the situation from happening again, should the prince became king at an early age. He therefore chose Yi Cha-gyŏm, his maternal relative, who led the most influential aristocratic family of the time, the Gyeongwon Yi clan.

Necessity to adjudicate factional struggles and the strain of managing complicated diplomatic and military efforts led Yejong to retreat further and further into his books and Taoist rituals. Yejong was succeeded upon his death by his 13-year-old son Wang Hae. He was buried in Gaeseong in Yureung tomb. The annals of his reign were compiled by three historians, including Kim Pusik.

== Family ==
- Father: Sukjong of Goryeo
  - Grandfather: Munjong of Goryeo
  - Grandmother: Queen Inye of the Gyeongwon Yi clan
- Mother: Queen Myeongui of the Chŏngju Yu clan
  - Grandfather: Yu Hong
  - Grandmother: Lady, of the Gyeongju Kim clan
- Consorts and their Respective issue(s):
1. Queen Gyeonghwa of the Gyeongwon Yi clan; first cousin – No issue.
2. Queen Sundeok of the Gyeongwon Yi clan
  1. Crown Prince Wang Hae, 2nd son
  2. Princess Seungdeok, 1st daughter
  3. Princess Heunggyeong, 2nd daughter
3. Noble Consort, of the Kaeseong Wang clan; half first cousin – No issue.
4. Pure Consort, of the Haeju Choe clan
  1. Wang Gak-gwan (왕각관), 3rd son – a monk.
5. Lady Eun
  1. Wang Gak-ro (왕각로), 1st son – a monk.
6. Lady An
  1. 3rd daughter
7. Unknown
  1. Wang Gak-ye (왕각예), 4th son – a monk.
  2. 4th daughter

== See also ==
- List of monarchs of Korea#Goryeo dynasty
- History of Korea
- Yun Kwan

== Bibliography ==
- Breuker, Remco E. (2010). Establishing a pluralist society in medieval Korea, 918-1170: history, ideology and identity in the Koryŏ dynasty. Brill. ISBN 978-90-04-19012-2. OCLC 668211529.
- Kim, Jinwung (2012a). A history of Korea: from "Land of the Morning Calm" to states in conflict. ISBN 978-0-253-00078-1. OCLC 826449509.
- Kim, Yunjeong (2012b). "The Influence of Taoism on Goryeo Celadon". Journal of Korean Art & Archaeology. 6: 54–71. doi:10.23158/jkaa.2012.v6_05. ISSN 2951-4983.
- Lee, Peter H. (2010). Sourcebook of Korean Civilization: Volume One: From Early Times to the 16th Century. Columbia University Press. ISBN 978-0-231-51529-0.
- Pratt, Keith L. (2006). Everlasting flower: a history of Korea. London: Reaktion. ISBN 978-1-86189-273-7. OCLC 63137295.
- Seth, Michael J. (2011). A history of Korea: from antiquity to the present. Rowman & Littlefield. ISBN 978-0-7425-6715-3. OCLC 644646716.

Yejong of Goryeo House of Wang Born: 11 February 1079 Died: 15 May 1122
Regnal titles
Preceded by Sukjong	King of Goryeo; 1105–1122	Succeeded by Injong
