= Yi Chagyŏm =

Korean politician (fl. 12th century)

- Died: 19 January 1127; Beopseong-po, Yeonggwang-gun, Jeolla Province, Goryeo
- Occupations: Politician; Soldier; Poet (additional)
- Years active: ?–1127
- Era: Yejong of Goryeo; Injong of Goryeo
- Spouse(s): Lady, of the Haeju Choe clan (m. before 1094)
- Children: 6 sons and 4 daughters
- Parents: Yi Ho (father); Lady Kim of the Gwangsan Kim clan (mother)
- Relatives: Inju Yi clan

Korean name
- Hangul: 이자겸
- Hanja: 李資謙
- RR: I Jagyeom
- MR: I Chagyŏm

Yi Chagyŏm (died on 19 January 1127 (Note: In the Korean calendar (lunar), he died on the fifth day of the 12th month in 1126.)) was a politician, soldier, regent, and poet in twelfth-century Goryeo. Born into a noble family, Yi rose to power through strategic marriages and political maneuvering, becoming a pivotal figure in the royal court. His career was marked by ambitious political schemes and alliances, including marriages of his daughters to kings, which further consolidated his authority. Goryeosa, where notable traitors throughout Goryeo history are cataloged, dedicates a biography to Yi's service and corruption in the royal court.

At the height of his power, Yi Cha-gyŏm wielded significant influence and raised private armies. His corruption and arrogance strained relations with the king, and climaxed in disturbances which saw the main royal palace building set ablaze, though Yi emerged victorious against the king with the help of the powerful military general, Ch'ŏk Chun-gyŏng. Yet, Yi's repeated attempts to poison the king widened the rift with Ch'ŏk, eventually resulting in Ch'ŏk's betrayal and Yi's capture and exile. Yi died in exile in Yeonggwang.

== Biography ==
Yi Cha-gyŏm was born in Kaegyŏng, the grandson of Yi Cha-yŏn, who was the father-in-law of Munjong, and the son of Yi Ho. Yi Cha-gyŏm, being related to the king, entered court service through Eumseo (Korean: 음서; Hanja: 蔭敍), a pathway reserved for nobles that exempted them from the civil service examination. Yi Cha-gyŏm's father, Yi Ho, solidified his family ties to royalty by marrying his second daughter to Sunjong of Goryeo. Just by virtue of being a brother of a queen consort, Yi Cha-gyŏm was appointed to high office. But Sunjong died within three years of ascending to the throne, and Yi soon after lost office as a result of Yi Cha-gyŏm's sister, the queen consort, being found having an inappropriate romantic relationship with a slave after the king's death.

After the impeachment, Yi struggled to re-enter government for a while until he married his second daughter to Yejong of Goryeo (r. 1105–1122) in 1107. The union was Yejong's effort to appease the court officials who protested his military campaign against the Jurchens, since Yi Cha-gyŏm's father-in-law, Ch'oe Sa-chu, wielded significance political influence in Goryeo and Yi's brother-in-law, Kim In-jon, was a prominent figure in Goryeo's court and vehemently against the war with the Jurchens. In 1109, Yi Cha-gyŏm's daughter bore a son, who would later ascend as Goryeo's 17th monarch, Injong of Goryeo (r. 1122–1146).

In 1122, after Yejong died of cancer, Yi Cha-gyŏm installed his young grandson as the next king of Goryeo. Subsequently, Yi Cha-gyŏm enjoyed near-absolute power as the regent over the young king, eliminating political rivals, including former allies who opposed enthroning his own grandson and unsuccessfully conspired to usurp the throne and oust Yi. In 1122, Yi bestowed upon himself the title of Duke of Hanyang (한양공; 漢陽公) and in 1124, discontented with his title, he elevated himself to the Duke of Joseon (조선국공; 朝鮮國公). (Note: Joseon, though famous as a kingdom that succeeded Goryeo, used to be a monicker of Goryeo.)

Yi's already considerable power expanded significantly after marrying his two daughters to Injong, which fueled his descent into corruption. His sons built mansions side by side in Goryeo's capital, and Yi established for himself a court office (숭덕부; 崇德府) traditionally reserved for princes or the queen, thereby positioning himself as equivalent to the crown prince or queen. Corruption and bribery pervaded Goryeo's capital. One day, Yi Cha-gyŏm dispatched a private envoy to the Song dynasty, seeking appointment as the king's regent (지군국사; 知軍國事), without consulting Injong. Later, Yi demanded ex post facto that Injong recognize him as such. Enraged, Injong refused and resolved to remove Yi Cha-gyŏm from power.

=== The Rebellion of Yi Cha-gyŏm ===
In 1126, several of Injong's trusted advisers devised a plan to eliminate Yi Cha-gyŏm. With Injong's consent, they intended to enlist support from military generals who harbored animosity toward Ch'ŏk Chun-gyŏng, a close ally and relative of Yi. Injong dispatched one of his eunuchs to seek counsel from Kim In-jon. Although Kim In-jon agreed in principle to eliminating Yi, he cautioned that it would be challenging due to Ch'ŏk's influence in the military. Nevertheless, Injong remained determined and ordered Yi's removal. Yi became aware of the covert plot and gathered his allies to seek a resolution, but their efforts proved futile, knowing that any retaliatory action would constitute a coup d'etat.

On February 25, 1126, Injong's forces stormed the palace and killed Ch'ŏk Chun-sin, Ch'ŏk's younger brother, and Ch'ŏk Sun, Ch'ŏk's son. Their bodies were left scattered outside the palace. Unaware of these casualties, Ch'ŏk led some 300 Buddhist warrior monks. Ch'ŏk broke the padlock on the first palace gate and entered, shouting at the palace guards to surrender. The guards retreated further, locking themselves behind the inner gate and avoiding engagement.

On February 26, 1126, upon discovering the bodies of his brother and son, Ch'ŏk was consumed with rage and vowed to avenge them. He forcefully entered the palace but found himself thwarted by palace guards who had retreated behind the second gate. Frustrated, Ch'ŏk set the entire palace ablaze. Injong fled the fire and sought refuge in a pavilion north of the palace by the lake.

Fearful that Yi Cha-gyŏm and Ch'ŏk Chun-gyŏng would kill him and lamenting that he hadn't heeded Kim In-jon's counsel, Injong sent Yi a letter expressing his intent to abdicate. However, Yi faced challenges in accepting Injong's decision due to public sentiment and societal norms, which viewed such actions as treason and usurpation. Yi's supporters preemptively questioned how he could accept Injong's abdication, suggesting Yi had no desire for the throne himself. Seeking to demonstrate loyalty, Yi urged Injong to reconsider, leading Injong to rescind his abdication.

Scores of Injong's co-conspirators and soldiers were either executed or exiled, and the tumultuous events of the preceding four days only strengthened Yi Cha-gyŏm's hand. (Note: This sequence of events is taught in Korean curriculums as the "Rebellion of Yi Cha-gyŏm," although Injong and his advisors initiated the conflict.)

=== Estrangement with Ch'ŏk Chun-gyŏng ===
Amid Injong's realization that Yi's alliance with Ch'ŏk Chun-gyŏng contributed to his defeat, tensions escalated when an argument erupted between a slave of Yi's son, Yi Chi-ŏn, and one belonging to Ch'ŏk Chun-gyŏng. During the dispute, Yi Chi-ŏn's slave accused Ch'ŏk Chun-gyŏng of setting fire to the royal palace, suggesting he deserved execution. When Ch'ŏk learned of the accusation. he stormed to Yi Cha-gyŏm's house, publicly disrobing himself and loudly demanding that the authorities adjudicate his alleged crime. At the scene, Yi Cha-gyŏm refused to offer an apology. Later, after Ch'ŏk had returned home, Yi attempted reconciliation by sending his sons to ease tensions, but Ch'ŏk remained unappeased, vehemently blaming Yi and his family for the events leading to the palace fire.

During that period, Yi Cha-gyŏm placed great trust in Korean traditional divination (파자점; 破字占), which involved the breakdown and analysis of Chinese characters to derive meaning or predictions. According to one divination, it was foretold that "the eighteen (十八子)" would ascend to the throne. Since Yi's family name, 李, could be interpreted as 十八子 in Chinese characters, Yi came to believe that he himself would one day become king. In pursuit of this belief, Yi once attempted to poison the king, offering rice cakes through his daughter who was married to the king. However, the queen, aware of foul play, alerted Injong and foiled the assassination plan.

Meanwhile, Injong became aware of the growing discord between Yi Cha-gyŏm and Ch'ŏk Chun-gyŏng. He dispatched an adviser named Ch'oe to persuade Ch'ŏk. Ch'oe presented Ch'ŏk with a letter written by Injong the night before the palace turmoil, in which Injong lamented his own lack of virtue that could have prevented the crisis and expressed concern that the dynasty might collapse after enduring so much under previous kings. Upon reading the letter and incensed by Yi Cha-gyŏm's brazen attempts to assassinate the king, Ch'ŏk finally aligned himself with Injong.

In May 1126, Ch'ŏk and his forces stormed the palace while Yi Cha-gyŏm was occupied with state affairs, unaware of the unfolding events. Ch'ŏk had already moved Injong to a secure location. Upon realizing the shift in fortunes and understanding the situation was no longer in his favor, Yi Cha-gyŏm surrendered himself without resistance, and without wearing his official robe. Yi's fall came only three months after the palace fire. Yi was exiled to Yeonggwang and died in December of 1126.

During his exile in South Jeolla Province, Yi allegedly ate dried yellow corvina and coined the name "Yeonggwang Gulbi (영광 굴비; 靈光 屈非) ," combining the place of his exile, Yeonggwang, with "gulbi," which signifies determination or resilience, indicating his refusal to yield. Despite the usual fate of exiles being forgotten, Injong maintained respect for Yi as his maternal grandfather and childhood guardian. In a gesture of honor, Injong shared with Yi and his wife, Lady Ch'oe, tributes to the palace and held them in commemoration. Additionally, he bestowed 600 seok of rice upon each of Yi's sons.

== Family ==
- Father: Yi Ho (이호)
  - Grandfather: Yi Cha-yŏn (이자연)
  - Grandmother: Grand Lady of Gyerim State, of the Gyeongju Kim clan (계림국대부인 경주 김씨) – daughter of Kim In-wi (김인위).
- Mother: Grand Lady of Tongui State of the Gwangsan Kim clan (통의국대부인 광산 김씨) – daughter of Kim Chŏng-chun (김정준).
- Wife: Grand Lady of Byeonhan State, of the Haeju Choe clan (변한국대부인 최씨) – 2nd daughter of Ch'oe Sa-ch'u (최사추).
  - Yi Chi-mi (이지미); 1st son
  - Yi Kong-ŭi (이공의); 2nd son
  - Yi Chi-ŏn (이지언); 3rd son
  - Yi Chi-bo (이지보); 4th son
  - Yi Chi-yun (이지윤); 5th son
  - Yi Chi-wŏn (이지원); 6th son – married a daughter of Ch'ŏk Chun-gyŏng from the Goksan Ch'ŏk clan.
  - Lady Yi; 1st daughter – married Pak Hyo-ryŏm (박효렴).
  - Queen Sundeok; 2nd daughter – wife of Yejong of Goryeo and mother of Injong of Goryeo.
  - Deposed Princess Yeondeok; 3rd daughter – first wife of Injong of Goryeo.
  - Deposed Princess Bokchang; 4th daughter – second wife of Injong of Goryeo.

== Site web ==
- Lee Ja-kyum (in Korean)
- Lee Ja-kyum (in Korean)
- https://web.archive.org/web/20160304050940/http://mtcha.com.ne.kr/korea-term/goryo/term113-ijagyum%20nan.htm
