= Injong of Goryeo =

King of Goryeo from 1122 to 1146

Injong 인종 仁宗
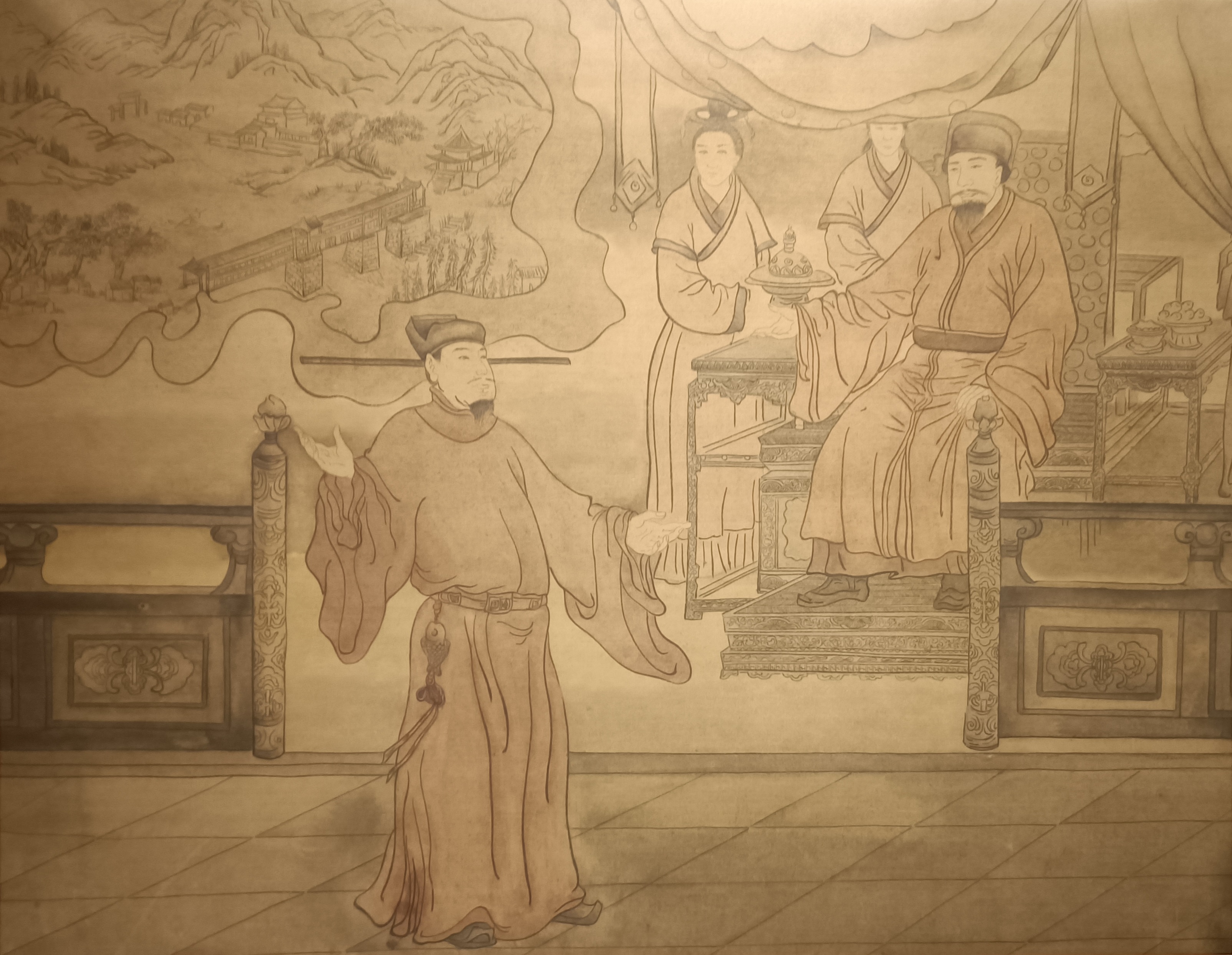
- In 1123, Lu Yundi (left), a diplomat of the Northern Song, met with Injong of Goryeo (right).

King of Goryeo
- Reign: 1122–1146
- Coronation: 1122; Junggwang Hall, Gaegyeong, Goryeo
- Predecessor: Yejong of Goryeo
- Successor: Uijong of Goryeo
- Born: Wang Ku; 29 October 1109; Queen Sundeok's manor, Gaegyeong, Goryeo
- Died: 10 April 1146 (aged 36); Bohwa Palace, Gaegyeong, Goryeo
- Burial: Jangneung (장릉; 長陵)
- Spouse: Princess Yeondeok (m. 1124; dep. 1126) Princess Bokchang (m. 1125; dep. 1126) Princess Yeondeok (m. 1126–1146) Princess Yeonsu (m. 1127–1146)
- Issue: Sons: Wang Hyeon Wang Gyeong Wang Ho Wang Chunghui Wang Tak; Daughters: Princess Seunggyeong Princess Deoknyeong Princess Changrak Princess Yeonghwa
Posthumous name
- Great King Geukan Gonghyo (극안공효대왕, 克安恭孝大王)
Temple name
- Injong (인종; 仁宗)
- House: Wang
- Dynasty: Goryeo
- Father: Yejong of Goryeo
- Mother: Queen Sundeok

- Korean name
- Hangul: 왕해
- Hanja: 王楷
- RR: Wang Hae
- MR: Wang Hae

Monarch name
- Hangul: 인종
- Hanja: 仁宗
- RR: Injong
- MR: Injong

Courtesy name
- Hangul: 인표
- Hanja: 仁表
- RR: Inpyo
- MR: Inp'yo

Posthumous name
- Hangul: 공효대왕
- Hanja: 恭孝大王
- RR: Gonghyo daewang
- MR: Konghyo taewang

Former name
- Hangul: 왕구
- Hanja: 王構
- RR: Wang Gu
- MR: Wang Ku

Injong (29 October 1109 – 10 April 1146), personal name Wang Hae, was the 17th monarch of the Korean Goryeo dynasty. He was the eldest son of King Yejong and Queen Sundeok, the daughter of Yi Cha-gyŏm. His reign saw two major internal crises that nearly ended the Goryeo dynasty, the collapse of the Northern Song dynasty, and the establishment of the Jin dynasty as the dominant power in East Asia.

== Background ==
=== Domestic ===
Injong ascended the throne in accordance with the third of the Ten Injunctions of Taejo, as "the eldest legitimate royal issue." Despite the reverend status of this document, its succession rules were often disregarded. As recent as in 1095 Injong's grandfather King Sukjong came to power after abdication of his nephew. At the age of twelve and a half Injong's succession became possible largely due to the influence of his maternal grandfather Yi Cha-gyŏm, while according to the report of the Song envoy Xu Jing, Injong's uncle Prince Po, supported by the Han An-in faction, "had designs on [the throne]"

=== International ===
By the early 1122 the Khitan-led state of Liao was effectively destroyed by the armies of Taizu of Jin, an emergent Jurchen-led state. Large number of Khitans fled to Goryeo. Operations of Northern Song against Khitan were unsuccessful, and the lost Song territories south of the Great Wall (Sixteen Prefectures of Yanyun) were recovered only after the Jurchen victory over Liao. The 1123 treaty formalized the superior status of Jin: the annual tribute of Song was set to 200,000 taels of silver and 200,000 bolts of silk. Despite the weak performance against Khitan, the Song government overestimated both the importance of the reclamation of Yanjing (modern-day Beijing) and its own military capabilities.

== 1122–1126: Control by Yi Cha-gyŏm ==
=== 1122–1123 ===
The early years of Injong's reign were dominated by his maternal grandfather Yi Cha-gyŏm. As the Supreme Chancellor (munha sijung, junior first rank) at the head of combined Secretariat-Chancellery (chungseo munha-seong) Yi Cha-gyŏm was the highest-ranking government official. His dominance was challenged during the last years of Yejong, but with the beginning of his grandson's reign Yi Cha-gyŏm took decisive steps to buttress it. By the end of 1122 Princes Po and Hye were exiled, Han An-in assassinated, and several hundred of his followers, including a dozen core members of Tanju Han and Cheongan Im clans, were either banished or demoted.

During this period, officers of the Royal Army began to play an important role in the domestic politics. Through his career Yi Cha-gyŏm cultivated muban military officials, that after 960 had a lower status and enjoyed less perquisites than their civilian munban counterparts. Two of his most important allies were Ch'oe Hong-jae, a high civilian official of a military background, and a military commander Ch'ŏk Chun-gyŏng.

With this power base Yi Cha-gyŏm emerged as the most influential figure in the Goryeo politics. He became the Chief-Minister-Extraordinary in charge of all three chancelleries (samseong), while keeping the position of the head (superintendent, pansa) of the Ministry of Personnel (Yi-bu). He was also created a Duke (kong). Nevertheless, his authority never became absolute: he had to take heed of other factions both in execution of policies he favored and in rooting out the opposition.

In foreign relations he was aligned with the Gyeongju Kim faction led by Kim Pusik and his brothers, advocating a submission to the newly established Jin. In 1123 the renewed Song offer of formal investiture was rejected. Jin stepped up the pressure on Goryeo by occupying Uiju (Poju) area along the Yalu River; from their point of view it was a repair of the frontier defenses. After a suppression of unrest in Balhae a secure North-Eastern frontier allowed Jin to focus on the Song.

=== 1124–1126 ===
In early 1124 Ch'oe Hong-jae and military officers associated with him plotted to overthrow Yi Cha-gyŏm, but were unsuccessful. Ch'oe and the associates were purged from their positions and exiled. Following the purge Yi married one of his daughters to Injong, and increasingly filled the mid- and high-ranking government positions with his loyalists and relatives, including his five sons. He and his faction profited from seized property of the purged officials.

The idea that Goryeo has to submit to Jin was still encountering resistance. The embassy dispatched in 1125 to Emperor Taizong of Jin was rejected by his officials because the correspondence it carried addressed the emperor improperly and did not use the term 'servant' when referring to Goryeo. The question whether to accept that the mandate of the Northern Song dynasty passed to Jin was debated through 1126. Eventually Kim and Yi convinced Injong and the reluctant officials to submit to Jin. By that time the Song were collapsing under Jin attack, Emperor Huizong abdicated, while a Goryeo embassy (that included Kim Pusik ) had to return without being able to reach then capital of Song, Kaifeng. The embassy to Jin sent in 1126 presented the submission of Goryeo in proper terms and brought up the matter of Uiju. Taizong transferred the disputed area to Goryeo.

It was reported that Yi Cha-gyŏm intended to usurp the throne and eventually planned to poison the king. According to this report, there was a popular prophecy that a man of the sippal cha, or eighteen child, an anagram on the Chinese character for the surname Yi, would become king and the transfer his court to the Southern Capital (modern Seoul), leading Goryeo to a renewed prosperity. Yi Cha-gyŏm is alleged to believe in this prophecy, based on his family name and a location of the family seat in Incheon, close to Seoul. Attempts of Yi to further aggrandize his station are a matter of the public record. He planned performance of royal ritual music at the tombs of his forefathers and celebration of his birthday as the anniversary of a king (insujeol). Both moves were opposed by Kim Pusik and his supporters.

A more serious challenge to the paramount position of Yi Cha-gyŏm was a rising organized by two courtiers, Kim Ch'an and An Po-rin. Beyond the involvement of some twenty-five young courtiers, the plot had a confidence of Injong and a support of three senior military officers, including one commander and one deputy commander of two (out of six) regular army divisions. Several senior statesmen, such as Yi Kong-su, approved the plot in principle but advised caution. The group struck "one night in 1126". The plan involved gaining control of the palace and king's person as the first stage of the coup, followed by a strike against other key targets. The conspirators captured the palace and killed several of Yi Cha-gyŏm loyalists, including the Minister of War (a brother of Ch'ŏk Chun-gyŏng). However, the palace was surrounded by the troops of Ch'ŏk Chun-gyŏng and armed monks led by Yi Cha-gyŏm's son. The rest of capital Kaesong remained in the control of the Yi faction. To finish the stand-off Ch'ŏk Chun-gyŏng ordered torching the palace (Yi Cha-gyŏm's disapproval was on the record as sent to him). Most of the palace, including libraries and the academy, burned down. "Countless" conspirators were killed. Injong offered to abdicate in favor of Yi Cha-gyŏm, but the latter refused.

In the following government reshuffling Yi Cha-gyŏm rewarded his loyalists. However, Yi Kong-su kept his senior position in the Secretariat-Chancellery, and two Kim brothers were actually promoted, with Kim Pusik becoming the Chief Censor. King Injong was living in Yi Cha-gyŏm's house and had married another of his daughters.

This triumph was, however, short-lived. Other aristocratic factions joined forces to bring Yi Cha-gyŏm down. They fostered a disunity between Ch'ŏk and Yi, using the question of responsibility for violation of the sacred palace grounds as a bait. Involvement of Injong, Yi Kong-su and Kim Pu-il left traces in the official records. In the fifth month of 1126 Yi Cha-gyŏm, his family and followers were arrested by the soldiers of Ch'ŏk Chun-gyŏng. Yi was banished to Jeolla province and later beheaded. Banished officials — Choe Hong-jae, members of Tanju Han and Cheongan Im clans and their associates — were recalled and reinstated in their positions. In the sixth month of 1126 King Injong married a daughter of Im Weonae. Ch'ŏk Chun-gyŏng was demoted and banished in 1127.

== 1127–1136: Reforms and Myo Cheong's rebellion ==
After the fall of Yi Cha-gyŏm the government was dominated by Kyeongju Kim and Han An-in/ Cheongan Im clans. Provincial clans, particularly from the Western Capital (Seogeong, modern Pyongyang) area were important in toppling Yi Cha-gyŏm and contended for a larger share in the decision-making. Paek Su-han, Chong Chi-sang, a famous poet and Confucian scholar, and Myo Cheong, a Buddhist monk and geomancer were prominent representatives of this faction. Myo Cheong appeared at the court in 1127 and officially became political adviser to Injong in 1128. It is possible that the Pyongyang group was used by the king to balance influence of the established aristocracy.

Already in 1127 Myo Cheong instigated a fifteen-point restoration rescript (yusin chigyo) of Injong. It included political reforms, called for austerity, and urged measures to restrict official exploitation of the peasantry. Educational reforms were part of the package and intended to strengthen the royal authority. Injong ordered that each chu (large districts) and hyeon (district) establish a school (to prepare to the civil service examinations), thus facilitating the access of local elites to positions in the central administration. Injong completed the reconstruction of the government school system by instituting the "six colleges" at the National Academy.

Myo Cheong had a reputation for sanctity and was a speaker "easily dazzled his listeners". His teachings were enjoying a growing popularity with the people and some members of the elite, including the king. Politically the Pyongyang faction was opposed by the Kyeongju Kim and Han An-in/Cheongan Im groups. Its supporters included Choe Hong-jae, an old foe of Han An-in faction, now a senior member of the Censorate, and Yun Ŏn-i, son of the famous general Yun Kwan, influential Confucian scholar and a close ally of Chŏng Chi-sang. Indeed, out of six senior censorial officials in 1133, two were supporters of Myo Cheong and only two steadfastly opposed him.

Myo Cheong provided a geomantic explanation of the recent disturbances in Kaesong and offered to cure the problem: since the geomantic forces around the Eastern Capital were waning, the court should move to the Western Capital, where the same forces were strong and "filled with vigour". This ideas, while somewhat extreme in their forcefulness, were in line with the prevailing thinking at the time. Ten Injunctions of Taejo accepted geomantic considerations as an important factor influencing government policies and ascribed a particular significance to the Western Capital. Injong's edict of 1129 commanded construction of a palace (Great Flowering Palace, Taehwa-gung), in Pyongyang to "revitalize our politics and [...] forever bestow felicity upon the following generations". The palace was completed in 1132 and Injong began to spend extended periods of time there.

In foreign relations Injong's government, while admitting the superiority of Jin, aimed to preserve independence and trade interests of Goryeo. By 1127 Song collapsed. The Jurchen armies conquered Kaifeng, and both Huizong, now retired, and the reigning emperor Qinzong were captured and exiled to Manchuria. Not long afterwards Song envoys tried to convince Goryeo officials to give them a direct overland access to the Jin and negotiate the release of the captured emperors. The request was denied at the insistence of Kim Pusik and his elder brother Kim Pu-il, while different sources record Choe Hong-jae as to be in favor of assisting the Song or as opposed to it. The relations with the Song were practically broken for the next few years: a request by Injong in 1129 to send an embassy was denied, while the embassy dispatched in 1132 was shipwrecked.

Goryeo traditionally provided a refuge for Jurchens that were at odds with the powers at home. During the first twenty years of the 11th century 6,846 Jurchen refugees were registered at Kaesong, compared with the average of 526 over two-decade periods of the previous one hundred years (and only 17 during 1081–1100). This policy continued under Injong, even if twice (in 1127 and 1130) the Jin used presence of the Jurchen refugees in Goryeo to pressure it into formal submission.

Pyongyang faction represented a more nativist and anti-Jurchen approach. Myo Cheong claimed that moving a capital to Seogeong (Pyongyang) would reinvigorate Goryeo to the extent that thirty-six states, including Jin, would pay homage to it. He urged Injong to declare himself emperor, institute his own era name, and attack the "arrogant Jin". A memorandum to this effect was also submitted to Injong by Chŏng Chi-sang and Yun Ŏn-i. Aided by the indecision of Injong an uneasy equilibrium between the factions continued for several years.

Disappointed by the rate of reforms, insufficiently decisive stance against Jin, and alarmed by purges of some of it supporters, Myo Cheong rebelled in 1135. At the Western Capital the rebels declared a new state of Taewi (Great Accomplishment). The rebels were enthusiastically supported in the northwest, but most of Myo Cheong's supporters in Kaesong deserted him. It is still debated whether Myo Cheong was actually the principal driving force of the rebellion or just its figurehead.

Im Weonae, the king's father-in-law, on the news of the revolt, mobilized armies to protect Kaesong. Officials associated with Myo Cheong were prosecuted: some, like Chŏng Chi-sang were executed, and many banished during 1135–1136. Several attempts were made to negotiate with the rebels. The situation became particularly threatening when the offers of military assistance came both from the Jin and Southern Song. Eventually Kim Pusik led a successful military campaign against the rebels. Myo Cheong was assassinated by his own army, and in early 1136 Pyongyang fell to the government forces. Yun Ŏn-i distinguished himself in action against the rebels, but was still banished by Kim Pusik as an associate of Chŏng Chi-sang.

== 1137–1146 ==
From the suppression of the Myo Cheong rebellion until his official retirement in 1142 Kim Pusik was an unchallenged leader of the Goryeo government. From 1140 onwards the banished supporters and associates of Myo Cheong began to be recalled and reinstated. By the early eleven forties the conflict of the Southern Song and the Jin reached an equilibrium that was formalized during the negotiates of 1141–1142. The Southern Song emperor recognized the suzerainty of Emperor Xizong of Jin, paying an annual tribute of 250,000 bolts of silk and taels of silver. Goryeo exchanges several embassies with the Jin, and in 1142 Injong was formally invested as its tributary.

In 1143 Injong appointed fourteen local magistrates, making another step in bringing local administration under the central control. As a result of the reforms of Yejong and Injong about one third of Goryeo's 450 or so prefectures and counties were under a direct control of the central government.

In 1142, Injong ordered the compilation of the Samguk sagi, a chronicle of events in the Three Kingdoms and Unified Silla. Using Chinese histories (particularly Shiji by Sima Qian), Kim Pusik at the head of the fourteen-author team compiled the oldest extant source on Korean history. It was submitted to Injong in late 1145 or early 1146.

== Succession ==
Both Injong and Lady Im (Queen Gongye) are recorded as having misgivings about their oldest son Prince Hyeon. Both doubted his ability to rule and Queen Gongye preferred the second son Prince Kyeong as the next king. Nevertheless, on Injong's death Prince Hyeon succeeded him as the 18th monarch of Goryeo.

== Family ==
- Father: Yejong of Goryeo
  - Grandfather: Sukjong of Goryeo
  - Grandmother: Queen Myeongui of the Chŏngju Yu clan
- Mother: Queen Sundeok of the Gyeongwon Yi clan
  - Grandfather: Yi Ja-gyeom
  - Grandmother: Grand Lady of Byeonhan State, of the Choe clan (변한국대부인 최씨)
- Consorts and their Respective issue(s):
1. Deposed Queen, of the Inju Yi clan; maternal aunt – No issue.
2. Deposed Queen, of the Inju Yi clan; maternal aunt – No issue.
3. Queen Gongye of the Jangheung Im clan
  1. Crown Prince Wang Hyeon, 1st son
  2. Wang Gyeong, Marquess Daeryeong, 2nd son
  3. Wang Ho, Duke Ikyang, 3rd son
  4. Wang Ch'ung-hŭi, 4th son – a monk.
  5. Wang Tak, Duke Pyeongnyang, 5th son
  6. Princess Seunggyeong, 1st daughter
  7. Princess Deoknyeong, 2nd daughter
  8. Princess Changrak, 3rd daughter
  9. Princess Yeonghwa, 4th daughter
4. Queen Seonpyeong of the Kim clan – No issue.

== Popular culture ==
- Portrayed by Lee Sung-ho in the 2003–2004 KBS TV series Age of Warriors.

== See also ==
- List of monarchs of Korea#Goryeo dynasty
- History of Korea

Injong of Goryeo House of Wang Born: 29 October 1109 Died: 10 April 1146
Regnal titles
Preceded by Yejong	King of Goryeo; 1122–1146	Succeeded by Uijong
