= Lady Sinjuwon =

Royal consort of Goryeo (fl. 10th century)

Royal consort of Goryeo
- Predecessor: Lady Seojeonwon
- Successor: Lady Wolhwawon
- Born: Unknown; Sinju, South Hwanghae Province
- Died: Unknown; Sinju, South Hwanghae Province
- Spouse: Taejo of Goryeo
- Issue: Unnamed son Wang So (adoptive)
- House: Sincheon Gang (by birth); House of Wang (by marriage)
- Father: Gang Gi-ju (강기주)
- Religion: Buddhism

Korean name
- Hangul: 신주원부인
- Hanja: 信州院夫人
- Lit.: Lady of the Sinju Courtyard
- RR: Sinjuwon buin
- MR: Sinjuwŏn puin

Lady Sinjuwon of the Sincheon Gang clan (Korean: 신주원부인 강씨; Hanja: 信州院夫人 康氏) was the daughter of Gang Gi-ju who became the 23rd wife of Taejo of Goryeo.

== Biography ==
Through her father, she was a descendant of Gang Bo-jeon (강보전) who was the great-grandson of Gang Ho-gyeong (강호경) and grandson of Gang Chung (강충). Gang was also the uncle of Queen Jeonghwa; who was the great-grandmother of Wang Geon, King Taejo, her husband.

They initially had a son, but died early after birth and she then raised Queen Sinmyeong's 4th son, Wang So and also adopted him like her own son, who later became the 4th monarch of Goryeo, Gwangjong. Wang So later married his own younger half-sister, Queen Sinjeong's daughter which later known as Queen Daemok. There is a speculation that Gang, who was from Hwangju, may have helped her in marrying Wang So as Gang's and Daemok's clan both came from the Hwangju region. This may have been the basis for Wang So's accession.

== Family ==
- Father - Kang Gi-ju (아찬 강기주; 阿飡 康起珠)
- Husband - Wang Geon, Taejo of Goryeo (고려 태조; 31 January 877 – 4 July 943)
  - Father-in-law - Wang Ryong, Sejo of Goryeo (고려 세조; ? – 897)
  - Mother-in-law - Queen Wisuk of the Han clan (위숙왕후 한씨)
- Issue
  - Unnamed son; died prematurely
  - Adoptive son - Wang So, Gwangjong of Goryeo (광종 고려; 925 – 4 July 975)
    - Adoptive daughter-in-law - Queen Daemok of the Hwangju Hwangbo clan (대목왕후 황보씨)
