= Kukcho =

Korean royal family member

- Hangul: 국조
- Hanja: 國祖
- RR: Gukjo
- MR: Kukcho

Kukcho (Korean: 국조; Hanja: 國祖) was a temple name given to one of the ancestors of King Taejo of Goryeo. The identity of this ancestor varied depending on the source, with the official history of Goryeo, the Goryeosa, stating that it was his great-great-grandfather, Kang Poyuk.

== Identity ==
=== Poyuk ===
According to P'yŏnnyŏn t'ongnok and Koryŏsa chŏryo, the identity of Kukcho was Kang Poyuk.

Kang Poyuk was the son of Kang Ch'ung. He had two brothers named as Ijegŏn and Posŭng. Kang Poyuk married his niece Kang Tŏkchu, the daughter of his brother Ijegŏn, and their daughter Kang Chinŭi was born. Chinŭi would be the mother of Chakchegŏn, the grandfather of King Taejo.

=== Other people ===
Later period Goryeo individuals questioned the identification of Poyuk as Kukcho. Yi Chehyŏn questioned the fact that Poyuk, who was traditionally portrayed as not being a direct male ancestor of the House of Wang, was given a temple name rather than his son-in-law, Taejo's paternal great-grandfather. Yi believed that Kukcho could not have been Poyuk as he was not a direct male ancestor of the House of Wang. He pointed out that in the Wangdae Chongjokki (Genealogical Record of the Wang Dynasty), a now-lost work, that the temple name Kukcho was given to the great-grandfather of Taejo, the husband of Chinŭi. While traditionally her husband was Suzong of Tang, this was already in dispute by the late Goryeo period.

During the late Goreyo period, Yi Saek would claim that that Kukcho was instead Kang Hogyŏng instead of Poyuk.

== Sources ==
- 高雲基. 韓国の中世における女性 : 13世紀の文献資料を中心に (PDF). 慶應義塾大学日吉紀要. 言語・文化・コミュニケーション No.27. 慶應義塾大学日吉紀要刊行委員会.
