= Consort Gang =

Consort Gang may refer to:

- Consort Gang (Gung Ye's wife) (fl. 10th century), wife of Gung Ye, ruler of Taebong
- Lady Sinjuwon (fl. 10th century), consort of Taejo of Goryeo
- Queen Sindeok (1356–1396), wife of Taejo of Joseon
- Crown Princess Minhoe (1611-1646), wife of Crown Prince Sohyeon

== See also ==
- Gang Jin-ui, posthumous queen of Goryeo
