= Lady Cheonchujeon =

Lady Cheonchu 천추전부인

Princess of Goryeo
- Reign: ?–?
- Successor: Lady Bohwa
- Monarch: Wang So, King Gwangjong
- Born: Wang Ah-ji / Wang Aji; Goryeo
- Spouse: Prince Cheonchu; first cousin
- House: House of Wang (by birth and marriage)
- Father: Gwangjong of Goryeo
- Mother: Queen Daemok
- Religion: Buddhism

Lady Cheonchujeon of the Gaeseong Wang clan (Korean: 천추전부인 왕씨; Hanja: 千秋殿夫人 王氏; lit. 'Lady of the Cheonchu Temple'), personal name Wang Aji (왕아지; 王阿志), was a Goryeo Royal Princess as the third child and oldest daughter of King Gwangjong and Queen Daemok who married her first cousin, Prince Cheonchu.

== Family ==
- Father - Wang So, Gwangjong of Goryeo (광종 고려; 925 – 4 July 975)
- Mother - Queen Daemok of the Hwangju Hwangbo clan (대목왕후 황보씨)
- Siblings
  - Older brother - Wang Ju, Gyeongjong of Goryeo (경종 고려; 9 November 955 – 13 August 981)
  - Older brother - Crown Prince Hyohwa (효화태자)
  - Younger sister - Royal Lady Bohwa (보화궁부인)
  - Younger sister - Queen Mundeok of the Chungju Yu clan (문덕왕후 유씨)
- Husband - Prince Cheonchujeon (천추전군)
