= Queen Mundeok =

Princess of Goryeo (fl. 10th century)

Queen Mundeok 문덕왕후

Princess of Goryeo
- Reign: ?–?
- Predecessor: Lady Bohwa
- Monarch: Wang So, King Gwangjong

Queen consort of Goryeo
- Tenure: 981–?
- Coronation: 981
- Predecessor: Queen Heonae
- Successor: Queen Seonjeong
- Born: 955; Goryeo
- Died: before 997; Goryeo
- Spouse: Wang Gyu, Prince Hongdeok; Seongjong of Goryeo (m. 981)
- Issue: Queen Seonjeong (with Wang Gyu)
Posthumous name
- Queen Hyogong Sunseong Yeongyong Sukjeol Wonheon Seonwi Mundeok 효공순성영용숙절원헌선위문덕왕후 (孝恭順聖英容肅節元獻宣威文德王后)
- House: Chungju Yu clan (official); Wang (agnatic and by marriage)
- Father: Gwangjong of Goryeo
- Mother: Queen Daemok
- Religion: Buddhism

Queen Mundeok of the Chungju Yu clan (Korean: 문덕왕후 유씨; Hanja: 文德王后 劉氏; 955–?) was a Goryeo princess as the youngest daughter and child of King Gwangjong and Queen Daemok, also the youngest sister of King Gyeongjong.

== Biography ==
The future Queen was born in 955 as the youngest child of King Gwangjong and Queen Daemok. Although she was recognized as being part of the royal Wang clan, she was put under her paternal grandmother's clan, the Chungju Yu clan.

She firstly married Wang Gyu, who was also the grandson of Lady Heondok and King Taejo, the only son of Crown Prince Sumyeong. They had a daughter together who would eventually marry King Mokjong, the son of King Gyeongjong.

But after Wang Gyu's death, Lady Yu remarried again and became a queen consort through her marriage with her half first cousin, King Seongjong, as his first and primary wife. From this marriage, Queen Mundeok became the fifth reigned Goryeo queen who followed her maternal clan after Queen Heonjeong, her half first cousin and the first Goryeo queen who remarried.

Her death date is unknown, but seeing that her son-in-law (biologically, her nephew), King Mokjong gave her posthumous names in 997, it seemed that she died sometime before that.

== Posthumous name ==
- In April 1002 (5th year reign of King Mokjong), name Hyo-gong (효공; 孝恭) was added.
- In March 1014 (5th year reign of King Hyeonjong), name Sun-seong (순성; 順聖) was added.
- In April 1027 (18th year reign of King Hyeonjong), name Yeong-yong (영용; 英容) and Suk-jeol (숙절; 肅節) was added.
- In October 1056 (10th year reign of King Munjong), name Won-heon (원헌; 元獻) was added.
- In October 1253 (40th year reign of King Gojong), name Seon-wi (선위; 宣威) was added to her posthumous name too.

== Family ==
- Father - Wang So, Gwangjong of Goryeo (광종 고려; 925 – 4 July 975)
- Mother - Queen Daemok of the Hwangju Hwangbo clan (대목왕후 황보씨; 925–?)
- Siblings
  - Older sister - Wang Ah-ji, Lady Cheonchujeon (왕아지 천추전부인; 950–?)
  - Older brother - Wang Ju, Gyeongjong of Goryeo (경종 고려; 9 November 955 – 13 August 981)
  - Younger brother - Crown Prince Hyohwa (효화태자; 956–959)
  - Sister - Royal Lady Bohwa (보화궁부인)
- Spouses
  - Wang Gyu, Prince Hongdeok (홍덕원군 왕규; 951–?)
    - Father-in-law - Crown Prince Sumyeong (수명태자; 904–?)
    - Unnamed mother-in-law (908–?)
  - Wang Chi, Seongjong of Goryeo (15 January 961 – 29 November 997)
    - Mother-in-law - Queen Seonui of the Jeongju Yu clan (선의왕후 유씨; 937–?)
    - Father-in-law - Wang Ok, Daejong of Goryeo (고려 대종; 937–969)
- Issue
  - Daughter - Queen Seonjeong of the Chungju Yu clan (선정왕후 유씨; 980–?); with Wang Gyu
    - Son-in-law - Wang Song, Mokjong of Goryeo (목종 고려; 980 – 1009)

== In popular culture ==
- Portrayed by Lee Hyun-kyung and Baek Seung-hee in the 2009 KBS2 TV series Empress Cheonchu.
