= Kang Chiyŏn =

13th-century Korean politician

- Hangul: 강지연
- Hanja: 康之淵
- RR: Gang Jiyeon
- MR: Kang Chiyŏn

Posthumous name
- Hangul: 충렬
- Hanja: 忠烈
- RR: Chungryeol
- MR: Ch'ungnyŏl

Kang Chiyŏn (Korean: 강지연; Hanja: 康之淵) was a Goryeo civil official. He hailed from the Sinchon Kang clan.

== Biography ==
When Mongol invasion of Korea happened and Goryeo military regime relocated capital to Ganghwado, Kang Chiyŏn was a senior vassal. After relocation of capital, he also held important posts of politics.

== Family line ==
According to Korean history book like Goryeosa and Pyeonnyeon-Tong-Long, Kang Chiyŏn is 12 generation descent of Gang Chung and 14 generation descent of Gang Ho-gyeong who is the oldest ancestor of Taejo of Goryeo. Kang Yun-sŏng who passed the civil service examination in the time of King Chunghye is 6th generation descendant of Kang Chiyŏn.

== Sources ==
- 김성회의 뿌리를 찾아서. Segye Ilbo. 2013-04-02. Archived from the original on 2016-03-04.
