= Lady Bohwa =

Lady Bohwa 보화궁부인

Princess of Goryeo
- Reign: ?–?
- Predecessor: Lady Cheonchu
- Successor: Queen Mundeok
- Monarch: Wang So, King Gwangjong
- House: House of Wang (by birth)
- Father: Gwangjong of Goryeo
- Mother: Queen Daemok
- Religion: Buddhism

Lady Bohwa of the Gaeseong Wang clan (Korean: 보화궁부인 왕씨; Hanja: 寶華宮夫人 王氏; lit. 'Lady of the Bohwa Palace') was a Goryeo Royal Princess as the fourth child and second daughter of King Gwangjong and Queen Daemok. There was no detailed records about her life.
