= Queen Daemok =

Goryeo queen (fl. 10th century)

Queen Daemok 대목왕후

Princess of Goryeo
- Predecessor: Princess Heungbang
- Successor: Queen Munhye
- Monarch: Wang Geon, King Taejo

Queen consort of Goryeo
- Tenure: ?–?
- Predecessor: Queen Munseong
- Successor: Queen Heonsuk
- Born: 925; Hwangju County, North Hwanghae Province,
- Died: Kaeseong, Kaesong Industrial Region
- Spouse: Gwangjong of Goryeo
- Issue: Gyeongjong of Goryeo; Prince Hyohwa; Lady Cheonchu; Lady Bohwa; Queen Mundeok
Regnal name
- Taemok (태목, 太穆; "Highest and Majestic")
Posthumous name
- Queen Anjeong Seonmyeong Uijeong Singyeong Gongpyeong Jeongye Daemok 안정선명의정신경공평정예대목왕후 (安靜宣明懿正信敬恭平靜睿大穆王后)
- House: Hwangju Hwangbo clan (official); Wang (agnatic and by marriage)
- Father: Taejo of Goryeo
- Mother: Queen Sinjeong of the Hwangju Hwangbo clan

Queen Daemok of the Hwangju Hwangbo clan (Korean: 대목왕후 황보씨; Hanja: 大穆王后 皇甫氏; 925–?), also known as Queen Taemok (Korean: 태목왕후; Hanja: 太穆王后), was a Goryeo princess as the only daughter of King Taejo and Queen Sinjeong, also the younger sister of King Daejong who became a queen consort through her marriage with her half older brother, King Gwangjong. She was also the mother of most his children and the first Goryeo queen to use her maternal surname, Hwangbo.

She was born in 925, while her marriage is believed to have taken place between 937 and 943. In 956, when Gwangjong proclaimed the law of slaves' emancipation (노비안검법; 奴婢按檢法), she strongly opposed it and begged him earnestly, but Gwangjong ignored and rejected her pleas. Daemok's opposition to the law stemmed from the Hwangbo clan, whose interests she was trying to protect; however, in Gwangjong's eyes, her maternal family was only one of the noble families to be removed.

Her death is presumed to have occurred after 975 but before 1002, when King Mokjong (her only grandson) gave her a posthumous name. She was enshrined in Heolleung tomb along with her husband.

== Posthumous names ==
- In April 1002 (5th year reign of King Mokjong), name An-jeong (안정, 安靜) was added.
- In March 1014 (5th year reign of King Hyeonjong), name Seon-myeong (선명, 宣明) was added.
- In April 1027 (18th year reign of King Hyeonjong), name Ui-jeong (의정, 懿正) and Sin-gyeong (신경, 信敬) were added.
- In October 1056 (10th year reign of King Munjong), name Gong-pyeong (공평, 恭平) was added.
- In October 1253 (40th year reign of King Gojong), name Jeong-ye (정예, 靜睿) was added to her posthumous name too.

== Family ==
- Father, also father-in-law: King Taejo of Goryeo (31 January 877 – 7 July 943)
  - Grandfather: King Sejo of Goryeo (840–897)
  - Grandmother: Lady Han, Queen Wisuk (850–?)
- Biological mother: Queen Sinjeong of the Hwangju Hwangbo clan (신정왕후 황보씨; 901–19 August 983)
  - Grandfather: Hwangbo Je-gong (869–?)
  - Older brother: Daejong of Goryeo (937–969); married his half-sister, Queen Seonui (937–?)
- Stepmother, also mother-in-law: Queen Sinmyeong (880–?)
  - Husband (formerly half brother): King Gwangjong of Goryeo (925 – 4 July 975)
    - 1st daughter: Wang Ah-ji (왕아지, 王阿志), Lady Cheonchujeon (950–?)
      - Son-in-law: Prince Cheonchujeon (950–?)
    - 2nd daughter: Queen Mundeok of the Yu clan (문덕왕후 유씨; 955–?)
      - Son-in-law: Wang Gyu, Prince Hongdeokwon (951–?); had a daughter who would become the first wife of King Mokjong
      - Son-in-law: King Seongjong of Goryeo (15 January 960 – 29 November 997); had no issue
    - 1st son: King Gyeongjong of Goryeo (9 November 955 – 13 August 981)
    - 2nd son: Prince Hyohwa (956–959)
    - 3rd daughter: Lady Bohwa

== In popular culture ==
Queen Daemok is often portrayed as an antagonist when the stories are based on Gwangjong's reign period.

- Portrayed by Jun Hye-jin in the 2002–2003 KBS TV series The Dawn of the Empire.
- Portrayed by Lee Young-ah in the 2009 KBS2 TV series Empress Cheonchu.
- Portrayed by Lee Hanee in the 2015 MBC TV series Shine or Go Crazy.
- Portrayed by Kang Han-na in the 2016 SBS TV series Moon Lovers: Scarlet Heart Ryeo.
