= Queen Seonjeong =

Queen Seonjeong (Korean: 선정왕후) may refer to:

- Queen Seonjeong (Mokjong), primary wife of King Mokjong of Goryeo
- Queen Seonjeong (Sinjong), primary wife of King Sinjong of Goryeo
