= Queen Seonjeong (Mokjong) =

Queen Seonjeong 선정왕후

Queen consort of Goryeo
- Tenure: 997–1009
- Coronation: 997
- Predecessor: Queen Munhwa
- Successor: Queen Wonjeong
- Born: 980; Goryeo
- Died: c.1009 (aged about late 20s); Goryeo
- Burial: Uireung tomb
- Spouse: Mokjong of Goryeo
Posthumous name
- Queen Uijeol Anheon Jeongsin Yanggyeon Wonjeong Seonjeong 의절안헌정신양견원정선정왕후 (懿節安獻貞愼襄堅元貞宣正王后)
- House: Chungju Yu clan (official); Wang (agnatic and by marriage)
- Father: Prince Hongdeok (biological); Seongjong of Goryeo (step)
- Mother: Queen Mundeok
- Religion: Buddhism

Queen Seonjeong of the Chungju Yu clan (Korean: 선정왕후 유씨; Hanja: 宣正王后 劉氏; 980–?) was a Goryeo royal family member as the paternal granddaughter of Prince Sumyeong and maternal granddaughter of King Gwangjong who became a queen consort through her marriage with her maternal first cousin or paternal second cousin, King Mokjong as his first and primary wife. From this marriage, Queen Seonjeong became the sixth reigned Goryeo queen who followed her maternal clan after Queen Mundeok, her mother.

== Biography ==
After her biological father's death, her mother remarried again with Seongjong of Goryeo who is believed to have raised her since she was young and treated her not so different like his own daughters, which made some believed that the future Queen was King Seongjong's real daughter.

Although her age was unknown at this time, and seeing that she married Wang Song (grandson of King Gwangjong and Queen Daemok), they must have been at the similar age or slightly older. They were believed to grow up together almost like a sibling, also Mokjong was said that he liked to follow her as she had taken care of him since childhood.

In 997, King Seongjong died and was succeeded by her husband. She then followed her grandmother, Queen Sinmyeong's clan. Her mother-in-law, Queen Heonae overtook the new King's throne and became a regent since he was not interested in politics.

Based on Goryeosa, it was written that:

"Mokjong was a King with calm and strong personality, was good at archery and horseback riding, enjoyed alcohol and liked hunting. However, he didn't pay attention to government affairs.”
"성품이 침착하고 굳세어 어려서부터 임금의 도량이 있었지만 활쏘기와 말타기를 잘 하고 술을 즐기며 사냥을 좋아하여 정무에 유의하지 않았다"

Also, there were rumors that the two enjoyed sodomy, so it didn’t seem like a good marriage between the couple and didn't have any children.

Even she made her husband ascend the throne due to her families' influence and exerted considerable influence in politics in the background of the king's favor, her personal life was not very happy. While Han In-gyeong and others led a Coup d'état to drive out Mokjong and contributed to the upkeep of Hyeonjong, Mokjong learned this and punished the Gim clan's members, but the oppositions to Mokjong were so openly active.

In 1009, Mokjong got dethroned and was assassinated on his way went to Chungju with his mother. After this event happened, the Queen's life or whereabouts didn't appear in the record, but it was presumed that she was killed along with him in 1009. After her death, she was enshrined in Mokjong's shrine and the couple were buried in the "Uireung tomb" (의릉; 義陵), along with received her posthumous name.

== Posthumous name ==
- In March 1014 (5th year reign of King Hyeonjong), name Ui-jeol (의절, 懿節), An-heon (안헌, 安獻) and Jeong-sin (정신, 貞愼) was added.
- In October 1056 (10th year reign of King Munjong), name Yang-gyeon (양견, 襄堅) was added.
- In October 1253 (40th year reign of King Gojong), name Won-jeong (원정; 元貞) was added to her posthumous name too.

== In popular culture ==
- Portrayed by Lee In-hye and Han Bo-bae in the 2009 KBS2 TV series Empress Cheonchu.
