= Kaesong Wang clan =

Korean clan from Kaesong

- Country: Korea
- Current region: Kaesong
- Founder: Gukjo
- Cadet branches: House of Wang
- Website: www.개성왕씨.com

The Kaesong Wang clan (Korean: 개성 왕씨; Hanja: 開城王氏) is a Korean clan, with the bongwan (ancestral seat) based in Kaesong, North Korea. The clan includes the House of Wang that ruled during the Goryeo period.

== Background ==
According to the Sŏngwŏnnok (성원녹; 聖源録), the founder of the Kaesong Wang clan is Gukjo, the great-grandfather of King Taejo. The Kaesong Wang clan were the local, regional lords, or hojok (호족; 豪族), of the Song'ak region who made their wealth as merchants in the Yellow Sea. In 918, one member of the clan, Wang Kŏn, became the founding King Taejo of Goryeo. The Kaesong Wang clan was not synonymous with the royal House of Wang, as there existed non-princely lineages of the clan descended from the first cousins of King Taejo. After ruling for 474 years, the Wangs was overthrown from the throne by Yi Sŏnggye, who founded the new Joseon dynasty. From 1394 to 1413, the new dynasty sought to exterminate the remaining scions of the Kaesong Wang clan and prohibited the use of the Wang family name. Some Wangs changed their family names to their maternal family names to survive. In 1413, the extermination order was lifted when King Taejong issued an edict of tolerance, ensuring the survival of the remaining members of the Kaesong Wang clan. As a result of the persecution, around 80 percent of the modern-day Kaesong Wang clan descends from Wang Mi (왕미; 王亹, 1365 – ?), a survivor of the extermination and a descendant of King Taejo's son, Prince Hyoeun.

Wang Hŭigŏl was the first member of the clan to pass the munkwa examination in the Joseon dynasty. His highest office would be that of first counselor (부제학; 副提學; pujehak) of the Hongmun'gwan. In total, nine members of the Kaesong Wang would pass the munkwa examinations.

The 2015 South Korean census recorded 22,452 individuals who were members of the Kaesong Wang clan.

== Notable members of the Kaesong Wang clan ==
- Wang Sing-nyŏm, first cousin of King Taejo and commander of the Pyongyang Regional Military Command
- Wang Jung-Hong, Commissioner of Korea's Defense Acquisition Program Administration
- Wang Sang-eun, South Korean politician
- Jun Ji-hyun (born Wang Ji-hyun), South Korean actress
- Wang Seok-hyeon, South Korean actor
- Wang Bit-na, South Korean actress
- Wang Ji-won, South Korean actress
- Wang Ki-chun, South Korean martial artist
- Wang Sun-jae, former South Korean footballer

== See also ==
- House of Wang
