= Hyeon-bi Kim =

Palace Lady Kim
- Worthy Consort (현비, 賢妃)
- Spouse: Gwangjong of Goryeo (m. 1029)
- House: Kim clan (by birth); House of Wang (by marriage)
- Father: Mr. Kim (김씨)

Palace Lady Kim (Korean: 궁인 김씨; Hanja: 宮人 金氏) was a Korean concubine to the King Gwangjong of Goryeo. As a royal consort, she was given the title of Worthy Consort (현비, 賢妃) in 1029.
