= Sinch'ŏn Kang clan =

Korean clan from Hwanghae Province

Sinchon Kang clan Shincheon Kang clan
- Country: Korea
- Founder: Kang Hogyŏng
- Connected members: Queen Kang; Queen Chŏnghwa; Lady Sinjuwon; Kang Chiyŏn; Kang Ch'ung; Kang Woo-suk; Kang Seok-woo; Kang Kyung-wha; David C. Kang; Kang Seul-gi; Kang Mi-na; Kang Yu-chan
- Website: https://www.sckang.org/

Sinchon Kang clan (Korean: 신천 강씨; Hanja: 信川 康氏) is a Korean clan from Sinchon County, Hwanghae Province. According to a census held in 2015, the clan has 52,945 members and in a census held in 2000, the clan had 13,909 families.

The daedongbo (a compilation genealogy book of related clans) of the Sinchon Kang clan claims that Kang Hogyŏng was the 67th generation descendant of Kang Hou (강후; 康侯), a grandson of King Wen of the Zhou dynasty. However, the historical veracity of that claim cannot be verified. Furthermore, the intermediate ancestor (중시조) of the Sinchon Kang clan is considered to be Kang Chiyŏn, a 14th generation descendant of Kang Hogyŏng.

Kang Chinŭi, the great-grandmother of Taejo of Goryeo, was a member of the clan as she was the great-granddaughter of Kang Hogyŏng, and the granddaughter of Kang Ch'ung.

== See also ==
- Korean clan names of foreign origin
