= Kang Chinŭi =

Queen Chŏnghwa

Queen consort of Goryeo (posthumously)
- Successor: Queen Wonchang
- Born: Kang Chinŭi
- Issue: Chakchegŏn
- House: Sinchon Kang clan
- Father: Kang Poyuk
- Mother: Lady Kang Tŏkchu
- Religion: Buddhism

Korean name
- Hangul: 강진의
- Hanja: 康辰義
- RR: Gang Jinui
- MR: Kang Chinŭi

Royal title
- Hangul: 정화왕후
- Hanja: 貞和王后
- RR: Jeonghwa wanghu
- MR: Chŏnghwa wanghu

Kang Chinŭi, posthumously honoured as Queen Chŏnghwa of the Sinchon Kang clan (Korean: 정화왕후 강씨; Hanja: 貞和王后 康氏), was the second daughter of Kang Poyuk who would become the great-grandmother of Wang Kŏn, founder of the Goryeo dynasty. As a figure from the Later Silla period, she is the first one from among the ancestors of King Taejo to be accurately reported by the remaining records.

== Biography ==
Kang Ch'ung was a son of Kang Hogyŏng, the founder of the Sinchon Kang clan. He had three children named as Ijegŏn, Posŭng and Poyuk. Kang Poyuk married with his niece Kang Tŏkchu, the daughter of his brother Ijegŏn, and their daughter Kang Chinŭi was born. Kang Chinŭi slept with a Chinese nobleman and birthed Chakchegŏn. The Chinese nobleman father of her son was from the ruling House of Li of the Tang dynasty, China. According to P'yŏnnyŏnt'ongnok and Koryŏsa chŏryo, he was Emperor Suzong of Tang. In Pyeonnyeongangmog (변년강목; 編年綱目), it stated that Emperor Xuānzong of Tang was the father of Chakchegŏn. While on his way to find his father in China, Chakchegŏn met Queen Wonchang and married her and decided to return to Korea instead. According to Record of Seongwon (성원녹; 聖源録), Queen Wonchang was a daughter of Tu Ŭnchŏm from Pyongju. Queen Wonchang gave birth to 4 sons; one of them whose name was Wang Ryung. His son eventually became the founder of Goryeo, Taejo of Goryeo.

According to Goryeosa, her elder sister climbed the top of Mount Ogwan (오관산; 五冠山) in a dream. In the dream, she urinated and flooded the whole world and she talked about this dream to her younger sister, Chinŭi. Chinŭi thought this dream implied good luck and she bought her sister's dream with her silk woven Chima jeogori. After that she would meet the Tang dynasty prince in Silla and give birth to Chakchegŏn.

== Family ==
- Father: Kang Poyuk
  - Grandfather: Kang Ch'ung; son of Kang Hogyŏng, founder of the Sinchon Kang clan.
  - Grandmother: Lady Ku (구씨)
- Mother: Lady Kang Tŏkchu (강덕주; 康德州); niece of her husband.
  - Grandfather: Kang Ijegŏn (강이제건; 康伊帝建)
- Husband
  - Son: Chakchegŏn
    - Daughter-in-law: Yongnyŏ (용녀; 龍女) / Chŏ Minŭi (저민의; 渚旻義; 焉旻義), Queen Wonchang (원창왕후)

== Sources ==
- 高雲基. 韓国の中世における女性 : 13世紀の文献資料を中心に (PDF). 慶應義塾大学日吉紀要. 言語・文化・コミュニケーション No.27. 慶應義塾大学日吉紀要刊行委員会.
