= Kang Poyuk =

Silla person

- Hangul: 강보육
- Hanja: 康寶育
- RR: Gang Boyuk
- MR: Kang Poyuk

Posthumous name
- Hangul: 원덕대왕
- Hanja: 元德大王
- RR: Wondeok daewang
- MR: Wŏndŏk taewang

Kang Poyuk (Korean: 강보육; Hanja: 康寶育) was a great-grandfather of the first King of Goryeo, Taejo of Goryeo. In 919, he was posthumously honoured as King Wondeok.

== Family ==
- Grandfather: Kang Hogyŏng
- Father: Kang Ch'ung
- Daughter: Kang Chinŭi

== See also ==
- Founding legends of the Goryeo royal family
