= Queen Wonchang =

Queen consort of Goryeo (posthumously)
- Coronation: 919
- Predecessor: Queen Jeonghwa
- Successor: Queen Wisuk
- Born: Yong-nyeo ^{(용녀, 龍女)} / Jeo Min-ui ^{(저민의, 渚(焉)旻義)}
- Spouse: Uijo of Goryeo
- Issue: Wang Ryung; Wang Pyeong-dal; 2 unnamed sons
Posthumous name
- Wonchang (원창, 元昌; "Primary and Prosperous"); Gyeongheon (경헌, 景獻; "Admirable and Worthy")
- House: Gaeseong Wang (by marriage)
- Father: Tou En Dian Jiao Gan

Korean name
- Hangul: 원창왕후; 경헌왕후
- Hanja: 元昌王后; 景獻王后
- RR: Wonchang wanghu; Gyeongheon wanghu
- MR: Wŏnch'ang wanghu; Kyŏnghŏn wanghu

Queen Wonchang (Korean: 원창왕후; Hanja: 元昌王后) or Queen Gyeongheon (Korean: 경헌왕후; Hanja: 景獻王后), was the grandmother of Wang Kŏn, founder of the Goryeo dynasty which she later Posthumously honoured as a queen alongside her husband in 919.

== Family ==
- Father: Du Eun-jeom (두은점; 頭恩坫)
- Husband: Uijo of Goryeo
  - Son: Wang Ryung (왕륭); married Lady Han, Queen Wisuk (위숙왕후)
  - Son: Wang Pyeong-dal (왕평달)
  - Unnamed son
  - Unnamed son

== See also ==
- Founding legends of the Goryeo royal family
