= David C. Kang =

American political scientist

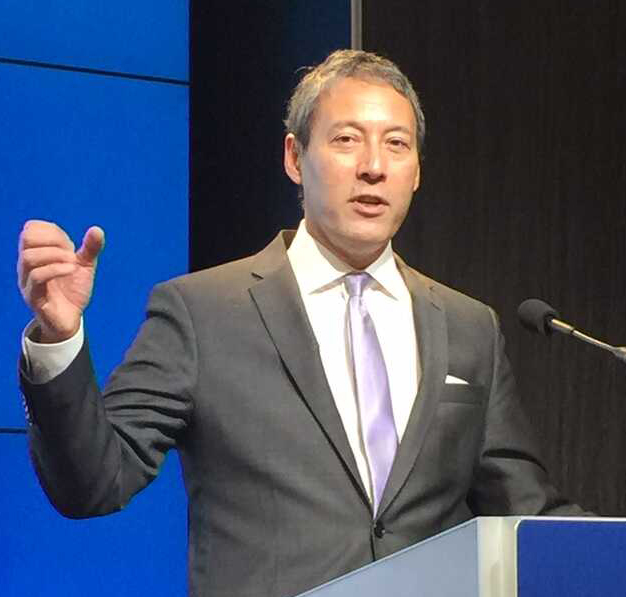

Maria Crutcher Professor in International Relations, Business and East Asian Languages and Cultures

Personal details
- Born: January 17, 1965 (age 61)

Korean name
- Hangul: 강찬웅
- Hanja: 康燦雄
- RR: Gang Chanung
- MR: Kang Ch'anung

David Chan-oong Kang (Korean: 강찬웅; Hanja: 康燦雄, born January 17, 1965) is a Korean American political scientist.

== Biography ==
Born to a family of the Sincheon Kang clan, he holds a bachelor's degree in Anthropology and International Politics from Stanford University from 1988 and a doctorate in Political Science from the University of California, Berkeley, 1995. Previously, Kang was a professor of the University of Southern California, where he was a professor in both international politics and organization and management. He led the Institute for Korean Studies at the same university. Kang has also been a professor at Dartmouth College and guest professor at Stanford University, Yale University, Seoul National University, Korea University and Université de Genève.

In 2024, Kang was sued by a former Ph.D. student who alleges Kang repeatedly made unwanted sexual advances, including inappropriate touching, late-night messages, and suggestive comments, retaliated after she rejected him by failing her qualifying exam and ending her research job, and attempted to coerce a sexual relationship while leveraging his academic authority. The lawsuit also claims Kang engaged in grooming behavior, targeted harassment during their time in South Korea, and created a hostile academic environment.

== Research ==
In his publication of They Think They’re Normal : Enduring Questions and New Research on North Korea - A Review Essay, David C. Kang talks about North Korea’s foreign and domestic policy, North Korea’s behavioral motivation, and lastly, to what extent North Korea’s behavior predictable or not. He uses three scholarly works from Patrick McEachern, Stephan Haggard, Marcus Noland, and Suk-Young Kim to fundamentally understand North Korea’s way of survival as a communist regime and their future endeavors.

== Publications ==
- Kang, David C.; Cha, Victor (2003). Nuclear North Korea: A Debate on Engagement Strategies. Columbia University Press.
- Kang, David C. (2002). Crony Capitalism: Corruption and Development in South Korea and the Philippines. Cambridge University Press.
- Kang, David C. (2007). China Rising: Peace, Power, and Order in East Asia. Columbia University Press.
- Sung Chull Kim; Kang, David C. (2009). Engagement with North Korea: A Viable Alternative. SUNY Press.
- Kang, David C. (2010). East Asia Before the West: Five Centuries of Trade and Tribute. Columbia University Press.
- Kang, David C. (2011). They Think They’Re Normal: Enduring Questions and New Research on North Korea - A Review Essay . International Security, vol. 36, no. 3, 2011, pp. 142–171.
- Kang, David C. (2017) American Grand Strategy and East Asian Security in the Twenty-First Century. Cambridge University Press.
- Haggard, Stephan; Kang, David C. (2020) East Asia in the World: Twelve Events That Shaped the Modern International Order. Cambridge University Press.
- Huang, Chin-hao; Kang, David C. (2022). State Formation through Emulation: The East Asian Model. Cambridge University Press.
- Ma, Xinru: Kang David C. (2024). Beyond Power Transitions: The Lessons of East Asian History and the Future of U.S.-China Relations. Cambridge University Press.
- Haggard, Stephan; Kang, David C. (2025) East Asia and the Modern International Order: From Imperialism to the Cold War. Cambridge University Press.

== See also ==
- 2018 North Korea–United States summit
- April 2018 inter-Korean summit
