= Consort Kang (Kung Ye's wife) =

Queen consort of Taebong (fl. 10th century)

Queen Kang

Queen consort of Taebong
- Tenure: 901–915
- Coronation: 901
- Predecessor: Dynasty established
- Successor: Dynasty abolished (Queen Sinhye as the first Goryeo Queen consort)
- Born: Unknown; Sincheon-gun, South Hwanghae Province, Later Three Kingdoms
- Died: 915; Cheorwon County, Gangwon Province, Taebong
- Spouse: Kung Ye
- Issue: Sin Kwang; Ch'ŏng Kwang
Names
- Lady Kang (부인 강씨; 夫人 康氏)
- House: Sinchon Kang clan
- Father: Gang Yeonchang
- Mother: Lady Baek
- Religion: Buddhism

Korean name
- Hangul: 강비
- Hanja: 康妃
- RR: Gangbi
- MR: Kangbi

Queen Kang of the Sinchon Kang clan (died 915) was the daughter of a wealthy and strong family in Sincheon during the Later Three Kingdoms periods. She was the wife of Kung Ye and later became the queen consort in 901 following his ascension to the throne as a short-lived King of Taebong.

== Historical life ==
Lady Kang was married to Kung Ye and bore him 2 sons: Ch'ŏnggwang (청광) and Singwang (신광). However, Kung Ye suspected that she might have committed adultery and accused her of doing such things, then used a fiery hot iron pestle to mutilate (or pare) her vagina and killed their sons. As Kung Ye often boasted that he could read people's minds, he practiced a harsh government of terror, such as killing several generals and servants for treason just like Kang.

== Legends ==
=== Legend from Cheorwon ===
According to a legend passed down in Cheorwon, Gangwon Province, it was said that Lady Kang was actually married to her far-relative, Wang Kon, but was forced to marry Kung Ye and couldn't forget Wang Kon. From this, it was described that she was killed by Kung Ye after discovered for having an affair with Wang Kon.

=== Legend from Gapyeong ===
Meanwhile, according to a legend passed down in Gapyeong, Gyeonggi Province that contrary to history, Queen Kang asked Kung Ye to stop his tyrannical rule, but instead made Kung Ye angrier. She was then exiled to one of Gapyeong's mountains. Later on, as Kung Ye ran away when Wang Geon's counter-revolution broke out, he couldn't forget Kang's advice for him and went to Gapyeong, where she was exiled. However, Kang had already died when Kung Ye was there.

== In popular culture ==
=== Literature ===
In a novel titled "Crown Prince Maui" (마의태자) by Lee Kwang-soo, Lady Kang was named as Kang Na-young (강나영) and described as a person with outstanding martial arts and resourcefulness. However, she was disappointed with Kung Ye's tyranny and stalked Wang Kon while eventually died in Kung Ye's hand.

=== Television ===
In the KBS1 TV series "Taejo Wang Geon", Lady Kang was named as Kang Yeon-hwa (강연화), which "Yeon-hwa" resembles the image of a single lotus blooming in the mud. She was said to originally betrothed with Wang Kon since childhood and loved each other, but were separated after Wang's father, Wang Ryung declined this betrothal. Described as an ideal wife due to her beautiful, strong personality, and wise, she was respected by many. Being aware of her position, she never tried to get involved in country affairs more than necessary, but she must live twisted upon becoming an unwanted empress.

Regardless of the fact that she couldn't connect with her loved one and her husband never showed any affection at all although she served Kung Ye with all of her heart as a husband and king. As soon as their children were born, they were taken away by him and Kang couldn't raise any of them herself. Due to Kung Ye's circumstances, the country was literally living hell and whenever Kang went to an event or public speaking, Kung Ye became mad and all kinds of slaughter took place. Although she wanted to try to do something, she couldn't get involved in politics due to her position as a woman and then tried her best to advise Kung Ye, which instead made Kung Ye's madness getting worse. She later abused Kung Ye and openly encouraged Wang Kon to revolt, which she and her two sons were sacrificed for Kung Ye's madness at the end.
Queen Kang is portrayed by Kim Hye-ri and Jung-hoo in the 2000–2002 KBS1 TV series Taejo Wang Geon.

== Family ==
- Husband: Kung Ye (궁예, 弓裔; died 918)
  - Son: Sin Kwang (신광, 神光; d. 915)
  - Son: Ch'ŏng Kwang (청광, 淸光; d. 915)

=== Ancestors ===
Ancestors of Consort Kang (Kung Ye's wife)

Kang-Chung 강충
Kang Bo-jeon 강보전 a Silla Munhataehaksa (신라 문하태학사)
Lady Gu Chi-ui 부인 구치의
Kang Sun-san 강순산
Kang Man-ru 강만루 a Great General (대장군)
Kang Yeon-chang 강연창
Queen Kang 강비
Mr. Baek 백씨
Mr. Baek 백씨
Mr. Baek 백씨
Lady Baek 부인 백씨
