= Gwangjong of Goryeo =

King of Goryeo from 949 to 975

Gwangjong 광종 光宗
- Emperor of Goryeo

King of Goryeo
- Reign: 949–975
- Coronation: 949; Gaegyeong, Goryeo
- Predecessor: Jeongjong of Goryeo
- Successor: Gyeongjong of Goryeo
- Born: Wang So; 925; Gaegyeong, Goryeo
- Died: 4 July 975 (aged 49–50); Gaegyeong, Goryeo
- Burial: Heolleung (헌릉; 憲陵)
- Queen Consort: Queen Daemok
- Consort: Lady Gyeonghwa; Palace Lady Kim
- Issue: Sons: Gyeongjong of Goryeo Crown Prince Hyohwa; Daughters: Lady Cheonchujeon Lady Bohwa Queen Mundeok
Era dates
- Gwangdeok (광덕; 光德): 949–952; Junpung (준풍; 峻豊): 960–963
Posthumous name
- Great King Hongdo Seonyeol Pyeongse Daeseong (홍도선열평세대성대왕, 弘道宣烈平世大成大王; original); Great King Ganghye Uihyo Sukheon Pyeongse Seonyeol Daeseong (강혜의효숙헌평세선열대성대왕, 康惠懿孝肅憲平世宣烈大成大王; final)
Temple name
- Gwangjong (광종; 光宗)
- House: Wang
- Dynasty: Goryeo
- Father: Taejo of Goryeo
- Mother: Queen Sinmyeong

Korean name
- Hangul: 왕소
- Hanja: 王昭
- RR: Wang So
- MR: Wang So

Monarch name
- Hangul: 광종
- Hanja: 光宗
- RR: Gwangjong
- MR: Kwangjong

Courtesy name
- Hangul: 일화
- Hanja: 日華
- RR: Ilhwa
- MR: Irhwa

Posthumous name
- Hangul: 대성대왕
- Hanja: 大成大王
- RR: Daeseong daewang
- MR: Taesŏng taewang

Gwangjong (925 – 4 July 975), personal name Wang So, was the fourth monarch of the Goryeo dynasty of Korea.

== Biography ==
=== Birth and early life ===
Gwangjong was born in 925 as Wang So, fourth son of King Taejo, who had founded Goryeo in 918. His mother was Queen Sinmyeongsunseong of the Chungju Yu clan, who also gave birth to princes Wang T'ae, Wang Yo, Wang Chŏng, Jeungtong, as well as the princesses, Princess Nakrang and Princess Heungbang. Moreover, Gwangjong had twenty half-brothers and seven half-sisters from his father's other marriages.

As he had three older brothers, Mu, T'ae and Yo, he was far from the succession to the throne; however, Wang T'ae died early, and Wang Mu died in 945, three years after being crowned king, leaving the throne to Wang Yo, who ruled Goryeo for four years as Jeongjong. Before dying, he decided to make Wang So his heir instead of his one and only son, Prince Gyeongchunwon.

According to his contemporary Ch'oe Sŭng-no, Gwangjong "was careful and laconic, but bold if he had to seize an opportunity." He had excellent appearance and qualities, and he received a special love from his father.

During his time as a prince, he gave a great contribution in the crowning of Wang Yo as Jeongjong, and played a big role in removing opposing forces to the sovereigns: one was Wang Kyu, who had helped King Taejo in the founding of Goryeo, climbing to the position of prime minister, and who, after King Hyejong was crowned, tried to carry out a coup to raise his grandson, prince Gwangju, to the throne. The second one was Pak Surhŭi, a general who promoted the appointment of Hyejong to Crown Prince and continued to support him later, becoming a threat to Jeongjong's coronation.

=== Reign ===
When Gwangjong ascended the throne on April 13, 949, at the age of 25, the kingdom of Goryeo was unstable: to unify the Later Three Kingdoms, his father Taejo made alliances with powerful and influential families through marriages. Keeping them satisfied was paramount, as those families all had their own armies and could rebel at any time. For this reason, Gwangjong felt the need to consolidate the power of the king and made the creation of an absolute monarchy the purpose of his entire government. To avoid an increase in the power and in the influence of noble families, he refused to marry a woman from a noble clan, but instead married into the royal family: Queen Daemok was his half-sister, whose mother came from the Hwangju Hwangbo family, while his second wife, Lady Gyeonghwa, was born by his elder half-brother Hyejong, the second king of Goryeo, and his first wife Queen Uihwa of the Jinju Im clan. Along with studying Taizong of Tang's book Difan (Chinese: 帝範; lit. 'Rules for an emperor') to better understand what to do, as he found many similarities between his situation and that of Taizong, Gwangjong rewarded all those who contributed to the progress of Goryeo, also making much effort to maintain good diplomatic relations with neighboring countries. This allowed him to concentrate power from within and without the court, and, seven years after the start of his reign, enact a series of reforms to promote a stable and royal-centered political system, and to expand economy and military.

His first reform was the law of emancipation of slaves (노비안검법; nobi angeombeop) in 956. The noble families had many slaves, mainly prisoners of war, who served as private soldiers; they numbered more than commoners and didn't pay taxes to the crown, but to the clan they worked for. By emancipating them, Gwangjong turned them into commoners, weakening the noble families' power, and gaining people who paid taxes to the king and could become part of his army. This reform won his government the support of the people, while nobles were against it; even queen Daemok tried to stop the king as the law affected her family, but to no avail.

Regarding foreign policy, Gwangjong maintained the close connection between China and Goryeo which was made by Taejo of Goryeo, focusing on the relationship with Later Zhou and the Song dynasty. Many diplomats were sent back and forth between the two countries, as well as many goods. Gwangjong also built diplomatic relationships with Wuyue.

In 957, Later Zhou diplomat and scholar Shuang Ji was sent to Goryeo as an envoy. Gwangjong discovered his ability and requested him to stay; Shuang Ji agreed and worked as a Goryeo official: with his advice, Gwangjong instituted the national civil service examination in 958, with the goal to expel officials who gained court positions due to family influence or reputation rather than by merit. The examination, based on the Tang's civil service exam and the Confucian classics, was open to all male free-borns to give everyone, not only the rich and powerful people, the opportunity to work for the state, but in practice only sons of the gentry could gain the necessary education to take the exam; royal relatives of the five highest ranks were, instead, left out on purpose. In 960, the king introduced different colours for court robes to distinguish officials of different ranks.

During Gwangjong's reign, medical centers known as taebiwŏn (대비원; 大悲院; lit. '"houses of mercy"'), which provided free medicines to poor patients, were set up in Kaesong and Pyongyang, later expanding in the provinces as the hyemin'guk (혜민국; 惠民局; lit. '"public health department"'). Taejo had established regional granaries (의창; 義倉; ŭich'ang) to face the times of drought, and Gwangjong added chewibo (제위보; 濟危寶), stores which charged interest on grain loans, which was then used for poor relief. These measures, even if in modified forms, kept on working for the next 900 years, parallel to better cultivation methods to keep up with the growth of population.

When emperor Shizong of Later Zhou died in 959, leaving the throne to his six-year-old son, the dynasty fell as the army, who was marching towards the northern border, defected and chose its commander Zhao Kuangyin as emperor. As Zhao decided to return from battlefield to found the Song dynasty, he left the mountains of Manchuria and the northern plains to Khitans and Jurchens. To improve Goryeo's defences, Gwangjong reorganized and expanded military, and built twelve garrisons along the northeast and northwest borders; also, under his reign, the kingdom moved the border beyond the Chongchon river, heading towards the Yalu river.

Gwangjong saw the association of religious institutions and the state as an aid to subdue local lords, and chose the abbot of Haeinsa to promote Buddhism among the people. He took capable monks as advisers, and promoted the construction of temples: for example, he built the Yongjusa in Cheongju, North Chungcheong, in 962, and the Cheongpyeongsa Temple in Chuncheon, Gangwon Province, in 973. The king also created an exam for Buddhist priests, called sŏnggwa (Korean: 성과), to link the government and the church, and he attempted to make peace between the Zen and textual schools to unify them under a single order, but he didn't have much success.

Other actions undertaken to reinforce the royal authority were naming Goryeo an empire and himself Emperor, thus ending tributary relationships with China; calling Kaesong the Imperial Capital and Pyongyang the Western Capital, and adopting the era name Gwangdeok (광덕; 光德; lit. '"shining virtue"') from 949 to 951, and Junpung (준풍; 峻豊; lit. '"exorbitant abundance"') from 960 to 963. By placing himself in the position of the emperor, he tried to instill in his servants that he had an absolute power.

Gwangjong's reforms were not well received by the nobles, especially by high military and civil officials who had helped his father in the foundation of Goryeo. The dissent of the nobles led them to stage a rebellion, but this attempt failed. In his eleventh year of reign, 960, Gwangjong started a series of purges, killing off his opposers: among them, there were his brother Wang Won (ninth prince Hyoeun), who was suspected of treason and poisoned, king Hyejong's son prince Heunghwa, and king Jeongjong's son prince Gyeongchunwon. Gwangjong also mistrusted his eldest son Wang Ju, who was five years old at the time. At the end of the purges, only forty of Taejo's 3,200 meritorious subjects who helped him in unifying the Later Three Kingdoms were still alive.

=== Later years and death ===
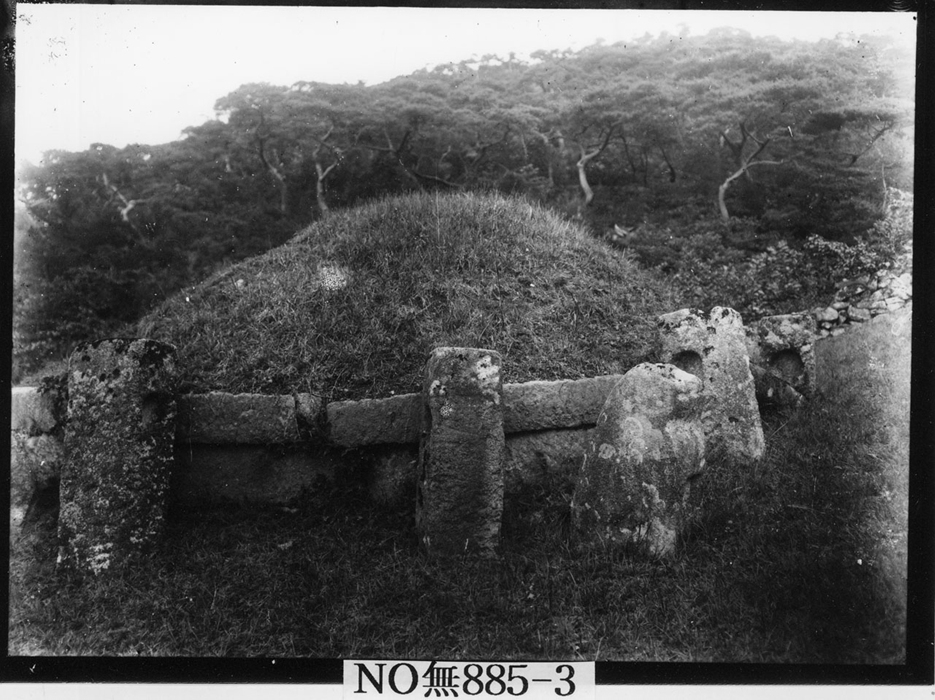
Gwangjong's tomb.

In his later years, Gwangjong's reliance on Buddhism increased. In 968, after a nightmare, he convened a reunion and banned the slaughter of his family. In December 971, an earthquake occurred in Goryeo, and the nobles and the people blamed the king. Gwangjong managed to handle the situation, but a second earthquake occurred in February 972: during this time, he had a nightmare and granted amnesty to prisoners in August.

He developed a serious disease in July 975 (fifth month of the Lunar calendar) and died just a few days later at the age of 50. He was given the posthumous name of "Hongdoseon-yeolpyeongse sukheon-ui hyoganghye daeseong dae-wang" (홍도선열평세숙헌의효강혜대성대왕; 弘道宣烈平世肅憲懿孝康惠大成大王), while his temple name Gwangjong means "shining emperor". His tomb, called Heolleung (헌릉; 憲陵), is located on the north side of Songaksan, in Kaepung County, North Korea. The site inspection in 1916 found a severely damaged tomb, but the stairway and the foundation stone are preserved.

He was succeeded by his only son Wang Chu, who became the fifth king of Goryeo, Gyeongjong. The reform policies to curb the power of the capital aristocracy were passed down to his successors, but they weren't able to pursue them; as a result, the bureaucracy turned from a meritorious aristocracy to a hereditary class. The law of emancipation of slaves was retracted during the sixth king's, Seongjong's reign.

== Legacy ==
Gwangjong's bold reform policy weakened the nobles and stabilized the kingship. In addition, the national civil service examination caused the raise of a new wave of political forces, while a new cultural heritage was developed independently by taking inspiration from China. Though Hyejong and Jeongjong established their reigns by relying on strong power bases represented by general Park Sul-hee and uncle Wang Sing-nyŏm, respectively, Gwangjong established his own power base, and, in order to restrain the power of wealthy people and influential vassals, he encouraged consanguineous marriages to avoid troubles with maternal relatives. He is regarded as the king who made the most strenuous and energetic efforts to strengthen the kingship in the early Goryeo.

His reforms contributed greatly to the formation of a new political order in the newborn kingdom of Goryeo, but they were mainly limited to politics; the restructuring of the local government, and the reorganization of national economy and social system were comparatively weak. He was always wary of the possibility of hostile acts, and killed nobles and relatives recklessly.

One of the most influential thinkers of the time was Ch'oe Sŭng-no, the son of a high-ranked official, who strongly opposed Gwangjong's autocracy. He believed that the privileges of the nobility were to be protected, and that having as officials the sons of provincial gentlemen with no power base at the court would put it in danger. Therefore, he condemned Gwangjong for his obsession with Buddhism and public projects, which, according to him, drove the kingdom into debt, and declared him a tyrant for his cruelty. In the memorial he drew up for the sixth king of Goryeo, Seongjong, he wrote:

He treated those under him with much propriety, and never lost his eye for judging people. He did not hold his royal relatives and high nobles too close, always restraining the mighty and powerful. He never neglected the humble, and accorded favors to widows and orphans. For eight years after he ascended the throne, the government was clean and equitable, meting out no excessive rewards or punishments. From the time he employed Shuang Chi, he leaned heavily toward the literati, dispensing excessive favors and courtesy to them. Thereupon, even the untalented came forward, upsetting the order of seniority and advanced quickly, becoming high ministers in less than two years. [...] As he neglected government affairs, important issues related to state security were ignored, but parties and banquets continued without interruption [...], and the initial virtue of the king gradually disappeared. [...] The population supplies were increasingly spent on buying honors. For this reason, the king didn't recover his previous zeal and diligence for state affairs, even when he met his counselors. Their disgust, therefore, deepened day by day. [...] Moreover, the king exceeded in his devotion to Buddhism and overestimated Buddhists. [...] In clothes and food, he spared no expense. In weighing up the merits of public works, he ignored the choice of the appropriate time. There was no respite in devising clever initiatives. Even according to a rough estimate, each year's expenses were equivalent to T'aejo's expenses for a decade.
In his last ten years, many innocent people were killed. [...] For sixteen years, from the eleventh (960) to the twenty-sixth year (975) of Kwangjong's reign, the intriguing and the wicked competed to advance, and slanderous accusations raged. The true gentlemen were badly tolerated everywhere, while petty people reached their goals.

— Ch'oe Sŭngno, Goryeosa

== Family ==
- Father: Taejo of Goryeo
  - Grandfather: Wang Ryung, King Wimu the Great
  - Grandmother: Queen Wisuk of the Han clan
- Mother: Queen Sinmyeong of the Chungju Yu clan
  - Grandfather: Yu Kŭngdal
- Consorts and their respective issue(s):
1. Queen Daemok of the Hwangju Hwangbo clan; half younger sister.
  1. Crown Prince Wang Chu, 1st son
  2. Prince Hyohwa, 2nd son
  3. Wang Aji, Lady Cheonchu, 1st daughter
  4. Lady Bohwa, 2nd daughter
  5. Queen Mundeok, 3rd daughter
2. Lady Gyeonghwa of the Jincheon Im clan; half niece – No issue.
3. Worthy Consort, of the Kim clan – No issue.

== In popular culture ==
- Portrayed by Kim Sang-joong in the 2002–2003 KBS TV series The Dawn of the Empire.
- Portrayed by Jung Seung-woo in the 2009 KBS2 TV series Empress Cheonchu.
- Portrayed by Jang Hyuk in the 2015 MBC TV series Shine or Go Crazy.
- Portrayed by Lee Joon-gi in the 2016 SBS TV series Moon Lovers: Scarlet Heart Ryeo.

== See also ==
- List of Korean monarchs
- History of Korea
- List of Goryeo people

Gwangjong of Goryeo House of Wang Born: 925 4 July
Regnal titles
| Preceded by Jeongjong | King of Goryeo; 949–975 | Succeeded by Gyeongjong |
