= Crown Prince Hyohwa =

Korean Royal Prince

Prince Hyohwa
- Prince of Goryeo
- Born: after 955; Goryeo
- House: House of Wang
- Father: Gwangjong of Goryeo
- Mother: Queen Daemok
- Religion: Buddhism

Korean name
- Hangul: 효화태자
- Hanja: 孝和太子
- RR: Hyohwa taeja
- MR: Hyohwa t'aeja

Prince Hyohwa (Korean: 효화태자; Hanja: 孝和太子) was a Korean Royal Prince as the second son of Gwangjong of Goryeo and Queen Daemok. Although his birth date was unclear, but based on his older brother, Gyeongjong of Goryeo who was born in 955, so Hyohwa should be born after that. Some modern historians hold the view that Hyohwa's early death saved his brother from death by their father. In 965, when Wang Ju appointed as the Crown Prince, many nobles and royals were killed due to Gwangjong's terror reign. Therefore, Ju also had to live with suspicion from their own father and fortunately, Hyohwa's too early death without any children to replaced Ju made Ju able to survived and succeeded the throne.

Preceded by Wang Ju	Prince of Goryeo	Succeeded by Wang Song
