= Chakchegŏn =

Korean local strongman (fl. 9th century)

- Hangul: 작제건
- Hanja: 作帝建
- RR: Jakjegeon
- MR: Chakchegŏn

Posthumous name
- Hangul: 경강대왕
- Hanja: 景康大王
- RR: Gyeonggang daewang
- MR: Kyŏnggang taewang

Temple name
- Hangul: 의조
- Hanja: 懿祖
- RR: Uijo
- MR: Ŭijo

Chakchegŏn (Korean: 작제건; Hanja: 作帝建) was a Korean hojok, or local regional lord, of Songak during the late Silla. He was a powerful and rich figure in the region, with influence over local Yellow Sea maritime trade. He would become the grandfather of Wang Kon, the founder of Goryeo. After Goryeo's establishment, he was given a posthumous name of King Gyeonggang the Great along with his temple name of Uijo (의조; 懿祖) in 918. He was buried in Onhyereung tomb (온혜릉; 溫鞵陵).

In the founding legends of Goryeo, Chakchegon married the daughter of the Dragon King of the Western Sea. In some versions, he is also to have been the offspring of a travelling Tang nobleman who would later become either Emperor Suzong or Xuanzong depending on the version.

== Biography ==
Chakchegon was the local strongman of the Songak region. He became rich and influential via the Yellow Sea maritime trade, extending his influence beyond Songak to Chongju, Yonan, Paechon, and Ganghwa. He married a woman, who would later be posthumously honoured by the title of Queen Wonchang, who gave him four sons, including Wang Ryung and Wang P'yŏng-dal.

== Legends ==
Chakchegon's mother was Chinŭi, with the identity of his father changing depending on the version of the legend. In the Pyeonnyeon Tongnok (편년통록; 編年通錄) written by Kim Kwanŭi during the reign of King Uijong, Kim states that the father of Chakchegon was Emperor Suzong of Tang who travelled to the Korean peninsula in 753 while he was still a crown prince. Before the prince left, he gave Chinui a bow and arrows, telling her to give them to her child if it were male. A later Goryeo scholar, Min Chi, would change the identity of the Tang Emperor from Suzong to Xuanzong after criticisms that Suzong was not recorded to have ever left China. In Min Chi's Pyeonnyeon Gangmok (편년강목; 編年綱目), he claimed that earlier Goryeo historians such as Kim had confused Xuanzong with Suzong, due to the latter's posthumous name. Joseon historians dismissed the idea of a Tang emperor being Chakchegon's father as Seon Buddhist myths and legends. In the Veritable Records of Taejo (Taejo Sillok), it contradicts the genealogy of the Pyeonnyeon Tongnok by stating that Poyuk was husband of Chinui rather than her father, making Poyuk the father rather than the maternal grandfather of Chakchegon.

According to the Pyeonnyeon Tongnok, Chakchegon was skilled in the Six Arts, with his calligraphy and archery being of particularly note. When he turned sixteen, he was given the bow and arrows from his Tang father. Chakchegon then sent off on a ship to meet his father, however the ship became stuck in the high seas and did not move for three days. The crew cast lots and the lot fell on Chakchegon, and he cast himself into the sea along with his bow and his arrows. There he met the Dragon King of the Western Sea who asked Chakchegon to get rid of his nemesis, Old Mr. Fox. For his aid in ridding the Dragon King of his enemy, the Dragon King gave his eldest daughter, Chŏminŭi, as a wife to Chakchegon. She would later be posthumously honoured as Queen Wonchang. However according to the Seongwonnok (성원녹; 聖源録) cited in the Goryeosa, Chakchegon's wife was the daughter of gakgan Dueunjeom, a local strongman from Pyongju.

== Family ==
- Wife: Queen Wonchang
  - Son: Wang Ryung – married Lady Han, Queen Wisuk
  - Son: Wang P'yŏng-dal (왕평달)
  - Unnamed son
  - Unnamed son
  - Unnamed daughter

== See also ==
- Founding legends of the Goryeo royal family
