= Uiryeong Ok clan =

Korean clan from South Gyeongsang Province

- Country: Korea
- Current region: Uiryeong County
- Founder: Ok Jin seo
- Connected members: Ok So-ri; Ock Joo-hyun; Ok Taec-yeon

Uiryeong Ok clan (Korean: 의령 옥씨; Hanja: 宜寧 玉氏) is a Korean clan. Their Bon-gwan is in Uiryeong County, South Gyeongsang Province. Their founder was Ok Jin seo, who was dispatched as one of the Eight Scholars (Hanja: 八學士) from the Tang dynasty to Goguryeo.

== See also ==
- Korean clan names of foreign origin
