= Founding legends of the Goryeo royal family =

Korean myth

The founding legends of the Goryeo royal family is a mythical account of the ancestral family of Wang Kŏn, who united the Korean Peninsula during the Later Three Kingdoms period and founded the Goryeo dynasty of Korea.

== Legends ==
According to the Pyeonnyeon Tongnok (편년통록; 編年通錄) written by Kim Gwan-ui during the Goryeo period, the origin of the Goryeo royal family is from Goguryeo. Hogyŏng, who called himself General Seonggol, came from Mount Baekdu and traveled far and wide, finally settling down in Songak (modern Kaesong) and starting a family. While hunting on Mount Pyeongna, he met a widowed mountain spirit who asked for his hand in marriage and to become the king of the mountain.

Gang Chung, a son of Hogyŏng, planted pine trees on Mount Songak so that rocks wouldn't be visible in order to fulfill a prophecy, based on feng shui, that his descendant would unite the "Sam Han" (삼한; 三韓), another name for the Three Kingdoms of Korea. He begot a son named Po-yuk, whose daughter Chin-ŭi had a child named Chakchegŏn with a member of the royal family of the Tang dynasty; according to the Goryeosa, which cites the Pyeonnyeon Tongnok, the father of the child was Emperor Suzong. The union fulfilled a prophecy given to Boyuk by a sage that the Son of Heaven from the Tang dynasty would come to him and become his son-in-law.

After reaching adulthood, Chakchegŏn, who was described as courageous and exceptionally intelligent, set sail for Tang to meet his father Emperor Suzong. However, he was caught in a storm in the middle of the Yellow Sea and encountered a dragon woman (용녀; 龍女) whom he brought back home and married. The Seongwonnok (성원녹; 聖源録) identifies the "dragon woman" as the daughter of a man from Pyongsan County named Tu Ŭn-chŏm (두은점; 豆恩坫), Pyongsan County was called Pyeongju (평주; 平州) during the Goryeo period, and was home to General Sin Sung-gyŏm of the Pyongsan Sin clan, who sacrificed himself to save Wang Kŏn at the Battle of Gongsan. The dragon woman, known posthumously as Queen Wonchang, gave birth to Wang Ryung, whose son Wang Kŏn would become the founder of Goryeo.

=== Interpretations ===
The story that Wang Kŏn was descended from either Suzong or Xuanzong was dismissed in the Goryeosa. The Encyclopedia of Korean Culture interprets Chakchegŏn being the son of Emperor Suzong of the Tang dynasty as a hagiography and his marriage to the dragon woman from the Yellow Sea as symbolic of the maritime influence of Wang Kŏn's ancestors, who engaged in trade with China for generations. Likewise, the Doosan Encyclopedia agrees that the claim of Emperor Suzong being Wang Kŏn's great-grandfather was invented to increase the legitimacy of the Goryeo royal family by linking it to the Tang royal family. According to Bae Han-cheol, the father of Chakchegŏn was a Korean merchant from one of the "Silla Quarters" (신라방; 新羅坊) in China, which were autonomous settlements of Korean merchants in the Tang dynasty.

=== Foreign accounts ===
Xu Jing (서긍; 徐兢), an envoy from the Song dynasty who went to Goryeo in 1123, documented in the Gaoli Tujing (선화봉사고려도경; 宣和奉使高麗圖經) that the ancestors of the Goryeo royal family were a great clan of Goguryeo.

== Sinchon Gang clan ==
The daedongbo (a compilation genealogy book of related clans) of the Sinchon Gang clan claims that Gang Hogyeong was the 67th generation descendant of Gang Hu (강후; 康侯), a grandson of King Wen of the Zhou dynasty. However, the historical veracity of that claim cannot be verified. Furthermore, the true progenitor of the Sinchon Gang clan is considered to be Gang Ji-yeon, a 14th generation descendant of Gang Hogyeong, not Gang Hogyeong himself.

== See also ==
Korean mythology
