= Kang Hogyŏng =

Korean clan progenitor

- Korean name
- Hangul: 강호경
- Hanja: 康虎景
- RR: Gang Hogyeong
- MR: Kang Hogyŏng

Kang Hogyŏng (Korean: 강호경; Hanja: 康虎景) was the first and oldest ancestor of Taejo who established Goryeo dynasty. His name can be found in Korean historical literature such as Goryeosa and Pyeonnyeon-Tong-Rok (ko:편년통록). He is the founder of the Sinch'ŏn Kang clan. While he is known to be the clan's founder, some regard the clan's semi-founder to be Kang Chiyŏn, the descendant of Kang Hogyŏng, to be more of the clan's official progenitor.

== Family ==
- Wife: Unnamed lady (좌곡 여인)
  - Son: Kang Ch'ung (강충; 康忠)
    - Daughter-in-law: Lady Ku (부인 구씨; 夫人 具氏)
      - Grandson: Yi Chegŏn (이제건; 伊帝建)
      - Grandson: Kang Poyuk (강보육; 康寶育)
      - Grandson: Kang Pojŏn (강보전; 康寶甸)
