= Wang Ryung =

Silla general (fl. 9th century)

- King of Goryeo (posthumously)

Prefect of Geumseong (금성태수)
- Tenure: 896 – 897
- Died: 897; Geumseong County
- Burial: Changneung tomb
- Spouse: Queen Wisuk
- Issue: Taejo of Goryeo
Posthumous name
- King Wollyeol Minhye Wimu the Great 원렬민혜위무대왕 (元烈敏惠威武大王)
Temple name
- Sejo (세조, 世祖)
- House: Wang
- Father: Chakchegŏn
- Mother: Lady Yongnyŏ
- Religion: Buddhism

Korean name
- Hangul: 왕륭; 왕융
- Hanja: 王隆
- RR: Wang Ryung; Wang Yung
- MR: Wang Ryung; Wang Yung

Art name
- Hangul: 용건
- Hanja: 龍建
- RR: Yonggeon
- MR: Yonggŏn

Courtesy name
- Hangul: 문명
- Hanja: 文明
- RR: Munmyeong
- MR: Munmyŏng

Posthumous name
- Hangul: 위무대왕
- Hanja: 威武大王
- RR: Wimu daewang
- MR: Wimu taewang

Temple name
- Hangul: 세조
- Hanja: 世祖
- RR: Sejo
- MR: Sejo

Wang Ryung (Korean: 왕륭; Hanja: 王隆; died May 897), also known as Wang Yung, was a Korean hojok, or local regional lord of Song-ak, who lived during the Later Three Kingdoms period. He was the father of Wang Kŏn, the founder of the Goryeo dynasty. He was later posthumously honoured with a temple name of Sejo and a posthumous name of King Wimu the Great by his descendants.

In 896, he surrendered to forces of Korean warlord Kung Ye, in exchange for the recognition of Wang's son, Kŏn, as the castle lord of Song-ak. Kung Ye appointed him as the prefect of Geumseong. He died there a year later.

After he died at Geumseong County in 897, he was buried in a cave along the river in Yeonganseong, which later named and known as Changneung tomb (창릉, 昌陵). On 11 March 1217, it was moved to Bongeun Temple (봉은사) and in 1243, it was moved again to Gaegol-dong in Ganghwa. In 1027 (18th years reign of Hyeonjong of Goryeo), he was given a Posthumous name of Won-ryeol(yeol) (원렬(열), 元烈) and in 1235 (40th years reign of Gojong of Goryeo), he was given again the name of Min-hye (민혜, 敏惠).

== Family ==
- Father: Chakchegŏn
- Mother: Queen Wonchang (원창왕후)
- Wife: Queen Wisuk, of the Han clan (위숙왕후 한씨)
  - Son: Wang Kŏn (877–943)

== In popular culture ==
- Portrait by Shin Goo in the 2000–2002 KBS1 TV series Taejo Wang Geon.

== See also ==
- Founding legends of the Goryeo royal family
