= Kang Ch'ung =

- Korean name
- Hangul: 강충
- Hanja: 康忠
- RR: Gang Chung
- MR: Kang Ch'ung

Kang Ch'ung (Korean: 강충; Hanja: 康忠) was 6th generation earlier ancestor of Taejo, who was the founder of Goryeo.

== Biography ==
When Kang Hogyŏng, the oldest ancestor of Taejo went to hunting in Mount Pyeon Na (편나), he met a goddess of the mountain. She offered him to get married with her and rule theocracy together. However, Kang Hogyŏng already had a wife. According to a story, he visited his wife in his dream, she got pregnant and Kang Ch'ung was born. Once day, Par Wong (Korean: 팔원; Hanja: 八元), who was a Feng Shui master in Silla visited Kang Hogyŏng and said “If you plant pine trees in Mount Song ak (Korean: 송악; Hanja: 松岳) and hide rocky wall, a person who unify three Korea will be born.” Kang Hogyŏng followed his prediction and planted pine trees covered rocky wall and Taejo was born.

== Family ==
- Father: Kang Hogyŏng (강호경, 康虎景)
- Mother: Unnamed lady (좌곡 여인)
- Wife: Lady Ku Ch'iŭi (구치의, 具置義)
  - 1st son: Yi Chegŏn (이제건, 伊帝建)
    - Granddaughter: Kang Tŏkchu (강덕주, 康德州)
  - 2nd son: Kang Poyuk (강보육, 康寶育)
    - Daughter-in-law: Kang Tŏkchu (강덕주, 康德州)
  - 3rd son: Kang Pojŏn (강보전, 康寶甸)

== See also ==
- Founding legends of the Goryeo royal family
