= House of Wang =

Royal family of Goryeo dynasty

- Parent house: Kaesong Wang clan
- Country: Goryeo
- Founded: July 25, 918, 1108 years ago
- Founder: Taejo of Goryeo
- Final ruler: Gongyang of Goryeo
- Titles: King of Goryeo; Prince of Shen
- Connected families: Sinch'ŏn Kang clan
- Deposition: 1392

The House of Wang was the royal ruling house of the Goryeo dynasty of Korea, from 918 to 1392.

Its founder was Wang Kŏn, the chancellor of Taebong who overthrew its tyrant king Kung Ye and founded the new dynasty of Goryeo. His descendants ruled as kings for 474 years. From 1170 to 1270, the Goryeo kings were puppets of the Goryeo military regime. In 1270, the royal house broke free from the military regime's grasp and volunteered to become vassals of the Mongol Empire. During the Mongol domination of Goryeo, the House of Wang became semi-autonomous vassals of the Yuan dynasty, and engaged in intermarriage with the ruling Borjigin clan. In 1356, King Gongmin was able to restore the independence of Goryeo. However, after the Wihwado Retreat in 1388, Goryeo general Yi Sŏng-gye was able to seize power. In 1392, Yi ended the rule of the House of Wang, proclaiming himself King of Joseon.

After they fell from power, the House of Wang was persecuted by the new dynasty. From 1392 to 1413, they were subject to an extermination campaign where male members from the direct line of the royal Wang family were to be apprehended and killed. Due to the extent of persecution, a majority of Wang Kŏn's descendants in the modern-day Kaesong Wang clan are descendants of his fifteenth son, Prince Hyoeun via Wang Mi (왕미; 王亹, 1365–?), a survivor of the extermination.

== History ==
=== Origins ===
The House of Wang originated from the local, regional lords, or hojok (호족; 豪族), of the Song'ak region. The ancestors of Wang Kŏn were thought to be influential maritime merchants, of Goguryeo origins. Chakchegŏn, the grandfather of Wang Kŏn, was an influential figure reaching beyond the boundaries of Song'ak, reaching as far as Ganghwa Island. According to historian Eugene Y. Park, Wang Kŏn's father, Wang Ryung, is thought to be the first likely member of the family to adopt the surname, Wang, mostly likely to facilitate trade with Tang China. Other historians, such as William E. Henthorn and G. Cameron Hurst III. suggest that Wang Kŏn was the first to adopt the surname after ascending to the throne of Goryeo, as his full name, Wang Kŏn, literally means "the kingly founder." The surname Wang (meaning King) was previously used in Goguryeo by some members of the royal House of Ko for its association with royalty. Song dynasty envoy, Xu Jing (徐兢), recorded that "The ancestors of the Wang clan are an illustrious family of Go[gu]ryeo".

The Wangs claimed ancestry from the legendary Dragon King of the West Sea via the wife of Chakchegŏn, later posthumously honoured as Queen Wonchang. According to the Pyeonnyeon Tongnok (편년통록; 編年通錄) by Kim Kwan-ŭi, Chakchegŏn was able to marry the daughter of the Dragon King of the West Sea, due to his help in eliminating Mr. Old Fox, the foe of the Dragon King. This is likely a tale created to "sacralize the dynastic line".

=== Rise to Power ===
In 896, Song'ak became part of the rising state of Later Goguryeo, later known as Taebong. King Kung Ye appointed Wang Kŏn as the castle lord of Song'ak. Wang would later become the chancellor of Taebong. On July 24, 918, four generals of Taebong persuaded Wang Kŏn to become the king. After the successful coup, Wang Kŏn was crowned as the first king of Goryeo on the next day, July 25. He would later unify the Later Three Kingdoms, absorbing Silla and conquering Later Baekje. To ensure his power, Taejo Wang Kŏn married 29 women from various powerful families, from fellow regional lords, to powerful maritime merchants, and the royals of the fallen Silla kingdom. The House of Wang was originally a primus inter pares amongst other powerful regional families.

Under Taejo's son, King Gwangjong, Goryeo became a centralised society with the strengthening of royal rule. Gwangjong attempted to curb the power of the aristocrats of the powerful regional families. With the help of a Chinese scholar, Shuang Ji, he instituted a civil service examination system in 958. He ruthlessly purged opposition to his centralization reforms, liquidating former comrades of his father.

=== Fall and Extermination ===
In 1388, with the aftermath of the Wihwado Retreat, Goryeo general Yi Sŏng-gye was able to seize control of Goryeo. Initially, due to lack of legitimacy, Yi placed a puppet king, King Gongyang, on the throne after dethroning both King U and King Chang. After the assassination of Goryeo loyalist Chŏng Mong-ju by Yi's son, Yi Pang-won, there were no more significant opponents of Yi Sŏng-gye. On August 5, 1392, Yi had gathered enough support to proclaim himself king and end the 474 year rule of the House of Wang.

Three days later, on August 8, the new royal court ordered the expulsion of all Wangs from Kaesong, with the exceptions of Taejo Yi Sŏng-gye's in-law, Wang U, his two sons, Wang Cho and Wang Kwan, and civil official Wang Sŭng, and his son, Wang Kang. The expelled Wangs were sent to Ganghwa Island and Geoje Island. Wang U was recognized as the ritual heir for the fallen kingdom of Goryeo, and enfeoffed as the Prince Gwiui to perform ancestral rites for the former kings of Goryeo. On February 16, 1394, two Joseon officials, Dongnae magistrate Kim Ka-haeng (김가행; 金可行) and Pak Chung-jil (박중질; 朴仲質), were caught using a blind fortune teller to discern the future fate of the House of Yi and the House of Wang. The incident raised suspicions on the Wangs. On March 28, ex-king Gongyang and his sons were moved to a different place of exile in Samcheok. The remaining royal members of the House of Wang who were on the mainland were moved to Geoje Island. On May 14, King Taejo of Joseon accepted the demands of his royal court to execute the members of the House of Wang, with the exception of the family of his in-law, Wang U.

On May 15, the Wangs on Ganghwa Island were killed. According to the Veritable Records, they were thrown into the sea. However, oral stories state that the Wangs were tricked into boarding a ship that was supposedly to take them to a new place of exile. However, the ship was intentionally sunk by divers who cut holes into the ship. On May 17, officials were sent to Samcheok to kill King Gongyang and his two sons. They were strangled to death. On May 20, the royal court proclaimed that an extermination campaign where anyone with the Wang family name was to be apprehended and killed. The remaining Wangs on Geoje Island were killed, with at least 111 former royals killed. In order to survive, the remaining Wangs either went into hiding or assumed their maternal surnames. Several Wangs were caught during this period of extermination. In December 1397, several illegitimate sons of members of the House of Wang were caught and executed.

=== Aftermath ===
The persecution of the House of Wang finally ended in 1413 under the rule of Joseon's third king, King Taejong. As a result of the persecution, a total of 135 members of the Goryeo royalty were killed, all of them being males close to the direct line of royalty, while the women and those far from the main branch were spared. Exceptions were also made for certain members from the direct line, such as Wang U and Wang Sŭng, who took part in the foundation of Joseon and were linked with the House of Yi by marriage. Wang Kŏŭromi (왕거을오미; 王巨乙吾未), a descendant of King Hyeonjong, was arrested in Gongju in December 8, 1413. The king refused when the officials asked Taejong to carry out his father's order and kill the royal descendant. On December 19, he issued an edict repealing the extermination and guaranteeing the safety of the remaining survivors of the purge. Taejong commuted the sentences of those who were guilty of not reporting Wang Kŏŭromi's existence. Kŏŭromi's son, Wang Sullye, would later be appointed as the ritual heir for the House of Wang by King Munjong, Taejong's grandson, on March 25, 1452.

== Legacy ==
While the number of Wangs diminished throughout time due to the early persecutions conducted by the Joseon Dynasty, there are still 22,452 members of the Kaesong Wang clan in South Korea as of the 2015 census. The actual numbers were thought to be higher since most of the Wangs changed their surnames, such as the Uiryong Ok clan, which claims to be descended from Chinese immigrants but whose claims are highly attested. Meanwhile, the House of Wang left a mark on a significant number of influential Korean clans, attributed to the former's extensive intermarriage policies during the reign of Taejo.

== See also ==
- Family tree of the Kingdom of Goryeo
- Goryeo

— Royal house — House of Wang Founding year: 918
Preceded by House of Kim; House of Kyŏn	Ruling House of Korea; 918–1392	Succeeded by House of Yi
