= List of Balhae monarchs =

Balhae (698–926) or Bohai was a mixed ethnic Goguryeo–Mohe kingdom established after the fall of Goguryeo. Balhae occupied southern parts of Northeast China, Primorsky Krai, and the northern part of the Korean Peninsula.

#	Personal name			Period of reign	Posthumous name (諡號)			Era name (年號)		
#	RR (Korean)	Pinyin	Chinese characters; Hangul	Period of reign	RR (Korean)	Pinyin	Chinese characters; Hangul	RR (Korean)	Pinyin	Chinese characters; Hangul
1	Dae Jo-yeong	Da Zuorong	大祚榮; 대조영	698–719	Go	Gao	高王; 고왕	None	None	None
2	Dae Mu-ye	Da Wuyi	大武藝; 대무예	719–737	Mu	Wu	武王; 무왕	Inan	Ren'an	仁安; 인안
3	Dae Heum-mu	Da Qinmao	大欽茂; 대흠무	737–793	Mun	Wen	文王; 문왕	Daeheung; Boryeok	Daxing; Baoli	大興; 대흥 寶曆; 보력
4	Dae Won-ui	Da Yuanyi	大元義; 대원의	793	None	None	None	None	None	None
5	Dae Hwa-yeo	Da Huayu	大華與; 대화여	793-794	Seong	Cheng	成王; 성왕	Jungheung	Zhongxing	中興; 중흥
6	Dae Sung-rin	Da Songlin	大嵩璘; 대숭린	794–809	Gang	Kang	康王; 강왕	Jeongryeok	Zhengli	正曆; 정력
7	Dae Won-yu	Da Yuanyu	大元瑜; 대원유	809–812	Jeong	Ding	定王; 정왕	Yeongdeok	Yongde	永德; 영덕
8	Dae Eon-ui	Da Yanyi	大言義; 대언의	812–817?	Hui	Xi	僖王; 희왕	Jujak	Zhuque	朱雀; 주작
9	Dae Myeong-chung	Da Mingzhong	大明忠; 대명충	817?–818?	Gan	Jian	簡王; 간왕	Taesi	Taishi	太始; 태시
10	Dae In-su	Da Renxiu	大仁秀; 대인수	818?–830	Seon	Xuan	宣王; 선왕	Geonheung	Jianxing	建興; 건흥
11	Dae Ijin	Da Yizhen	大彝震; 대이진	830–857	Unknown	Unknown	Unknown	Hamhwa	Xianhe	咸和; 함화
12	Dae Geonhwang	Da Xianhuang	大虔晃; 대건황	857–871	Unknown	Unknown	Unknown	Unknown	Unknown	Unknown
13	Dae Hyeonseok	Da Xuanxi	大玄錫; 대현석	871–895	Unknown	Unknown	Unknown	Unknown	Unknown	Unknown
14	Dae Wihae	Da Weijie	大瑋瑎; 대위해	895–906	None	None	None	Unknown	Unknown	Unknown
15	Dae Inseon	Da Yinzhuan	大諲譔; 대인선	906–926	None	None	None	Unknown	Unknown	Unknown

== See also ==
- Balhae
- Jurchen Jin emperors family tree
- List of monarchs of Korea
- Silla
- North South States Period
- List of rulers of China
