= Empress Hyoŭi =

Queen consort of Balhae

Empress Hyoui (효의황후, 孝懿皇后; literally "the filial and benign empress"; 715–776?), was a queen consort of Balhae as the wife of King Mun (Dae Heum-mu). It is unknown from where she came or whether she was the mother of his children.

Her existence is first known by the excavating of her tomb and tombstone in Ancient Tombs at Longtou Mountain, China. According to the Japanese history book Shoku Nihongi, King Mun's queen consort died in 776, but it is unknown whether the queen consort here refers to Hyoui or not. In 2004–5, at least 14 tombs during the Balhae period were unearthed from the Longtou Mountain. Chinese governments also revealed that the two tombs named M12 and M3 that in the form of a large stone chamber tomb, were Hyoui and Sunmok's tombs. In the same area, Princess Jeonghye and Princess Jeonghyo's tombs were also excavated in 1949 and 1980. But besides that, not much information has appeared.
