= Chang Munhyu =

Balhae military commander (fl. 8th century)

- Hangul: 장문휴
- Hanja: 張文休
- RR: Jang Munhyu
- MR: Chang Munhyu

Chang Munhyu (Korean: 장문휴; Hanja: 張文休) was a military commander of Balhae in the 8th century under the reign of King Mu. He is noted for the naval assault against Tang China in 732.

King Mu, son of Tae Choyŏng, was known for the audacity that he demonstrated against Tang. Balhae embattled Tang over the Issue of Heuksu Malgal tribes. When the Heuksu Malgal in the north of Balhae came under the influence of Tang in 727, he attacked the Heuksu Malgal fearing a pincer attack. To prevent further contacts between Tang and its allies, Heuksu Malgal tribes, King Mu ordered his commander Chang Munhyu to attack Dengzhou in Shandong Peninsula. As a result of the a naval assault launched by him in 732, the city's Chinese prefect, Wei Jun (偉俊) was killed. Dengzhou was occupied for short time by his forces, before his tactical retreat from the city.

== See also ==
- North South States Period
- Military history of Korea
