= Mohe =

Mohe may refer to:

- Mohe people, a Tungusic people of ancient Manchuria
  - Heishui Mohe, a Mohe tribe
- Mohe City, a county-level city in Daxing'anling, Heilongjiang
- Ministry of Higher Education
