= Sŏng of Balhae =

5th King of Balhae (r. 793–794)

- Hangul: 대화여
- Hanja: 大華璵
- RR: Dae Hwayeo
- MR: Tae Hwayŏ

Monarch name
- Hangul: 성왕
- Hanja: 成王
- RR: Seongwang
- MR: Sŏngwang

Sŏng (Korean: 성; Hanja: 成; died 794), sometimes called by his birth-name Tae Hwayŏ (대화여; 大華璵), was the 5th ruler of the Balhae. He was the grandson of King Mun, his father being the deceased heir Tae Koengnim (대굉림).

== Reign ==
He was the grandson of King Mun and Empress Hyoŭi. His father Tae Koengnim died before inheriting the throne.

He chose the era name Chunghŭng (중흥; 中興). King Sŏng was a very physically weak person, and lived for a few months after his rise to the throne. The most notable accomplishment that was done during his reign was the moving of the capital to Sanggyeong.

He didn't marry or have any children. After his death in 794, his uncle, Kang of Balhae, became the next King of Balhae.

== See also ==
- List of Korean monarchs
- History of Korea

Sŏng of Balhae House of Tae Died: 794
Regnal titles
Preceded by Tae Wŏnŭi	King of Balhae; 793–794	Succeeded by Kang
