= Jujagam =

National educational institution of Parhae

- Hangul: 주자감
- Hanja: 胄子監
- RR: Jujagam
- MR: Chujagam

Jujagam (Korean: 주자감; Hanja: 胄子監) was the national educational institution of Parhae. It was established during the reign of King Mun, modelling it after the Guozijian (Imperial Academy) system of the Tang dynasty. The head of the Jujagam held the title of gam (감; 監; lit. 'Overseer'), with the jang (장; 長; lit. 'Chief') serving under them. It was a government office responsible for executing national educational administration, ranging from the teaching of Confucianism to specialized fields such as gukja (국자; 國子; lit. 'National Studies'), Taehak (태학; 太學), as well as law, calligraphy, and mathematics.

== See also ==
- Kukchagam
- Kukhak
