= Tae Wŏnŭi =

4th King of Balhae (r. 793)

Chinese name
- Chinese: 大元义
Transcriptions
Standard Mandarin
- Hanyu Pinyin: Dà Yuányì
- Wade–Giles: Ta Yüen-i

Korean name
- Hangul: 대원의
- Hanja: 大元義
Transcriptions
- Revised Romanization: Dae Wonui
- McCune–Reischauer: Tae Wŏnŭi

Tae Wŏnŭi (Korean: 대원의; Hanja: 大元義; died 793; r. 793– ) was the 4th ruler of the kingdom of Balhae.

== Background ==
Tae Wŏnŭi was a son of King Mu, the second ruler of Balhae, and the brother of the previous king, King Mun; when Mun's son Tae Koengnim died, Wŏnŭi was chosen as the next king.

== Reign and death ==
However, upon ascending the throne the king showed a jealous and violent temper. In 793, he was slain by his ministers. The son of Koengnim was chosen to replace him, becoming King Sŏng.

== See also ==
- List of Korean monarchs
- History of Korea

Tae Wŏnŭi House of Tae Died: 793
Regnal titles
Preceded by Mun	King of Balhae; 793	Succeeded by Sŏng
