= Empress Sunmok =

Balhae queen consort (fl. 9th century)

Empress Sunmok (Korean: 순목황후; Hanja: 順穆皇后; lit. accomplished and majestic empress; died 830) of the Tae clan (태씨; 泰氏) was a queen consort of Balhae as the wife of King Kan.

Her tomb and epitaph were discovered at the Ancient Tombs at Longtou Mountain, China. She was queen of Balhae for only a short period, during her husband's brief 817 CE - 818 CE reign. He died in 818, and she outlived him for twelve years, until her death in 830 CE. She was buried in Longtou Mountain not long after that.

From 2004 to 2005, at least 14 tombs dating from the Balhae period were unearthed from Longtou Mountain. Chinese government officials revealed that one of these tombs, M3, which is a large stone tomb, belonged to Sunmok. Her tomb featured a gravestone, which consisted of reddish-brown sandstone 34.5 cm wide, 55 cm high, and 13 cm thick.
