= Princess Chŏnghye of Balhae =

Balhae princess (737–777)

Princess Chŏnghye (Korean: 정혜공주; Hanja: 貞惠公主; lit. the virtuous and kind princess) of the Tae clan (737–777 CE), was a princess of Balhae as the second child and eldest-living daughter of King Mun.

She was taught by Dunshi Yueli (敦诗悦礼) in her early years. She later married a man from her clan, Tae Puma (대부마; 737–?) and had a son who died prematurely in 760. She died in the 4th year of Boryeok era (777 CE), when she was 40. According to the epitaph accompanying her tomb, she was married and gave birth to one son, but both her husband and child predeceased her.

During the period of mourning for her death, her father was said to be deeply saddened, refusing to attend to court affairs.

In 780, she was buried in a tomb in western Chillŭng (진릉; 珍陵), Sŏwŏn (서원; 西原), which is now known as part of the Ancient Tombs at Longtou Mountain, Jilin, China. An epitaph dedicated to her, describing her and praising her character, was created at the same time. The epitaph was skillfully written, consisting of 725 words composed in a prose style. The characters used to write her epitaph were Chinese, using the Tang dynasty's writing system, while other elements of the tomb were distinctly Goguryeo. The epitaph has provided historians with insight into the Balhae, such as demonstrating that they wrote using Chinese characters, were capable of skilled calligraphy, and were likely highly-learned in forms of literature.

In August 1949, scholars from Yanbian University discovered her tomb and epitaph in the Yujing Mountain, Jilin. The tomb was large, and included impressive sculptures and carvings, such as two stone lions.

== See also ==
- Ancient Tombs at Longtou Mountain
