= Shangjing Longquanfu =

Balhae archaeological site in China

Coordinates: 44.1306°N 129.1417°E

Chinese name
- Chinese: 上京龍泉府
Transcriptions
Standard Mandarin
- Hanyu Pinyin: Shàngjīng Lóngquánfǔ
- Wade–Giles: Shang-ching Lung-ch'üan-fu

Korean name
- Hangul: 상경용천부
- Hanja: 上京龍泉府
Transcriptions
- Revised Romanization: Sanggyeong Yongcheonbu
- McCune–Reischauer: Sanggyŏng Yongch'ŏnbu

Shangjing Longquanfu (Chinese: 上京龍泉府) or Sanggyeong Yongcheonbu (Korean: 상경용천부), also known as Shangjing/Sanggyeong (上京, 상경), Huhan/Holhan Fortress (忽汗城, 홀한성), is an archaeological site in Ning'an, Heilongjiang, China. It was the capital of the Balhae (Bohai) Kingdom from 756 to 785, and again from 793 to 926.

The site is located in about 3 kilometres (1.9 mi) from the modern town of Dongjingcheng (东京城), and the ruined city is also colloquially called "Dongjingcheng". The site has been protected since the 1960s. The Chinese government has established the Bohai Shangjing National Archaeological Park and an archaeological museum at the site.

== Dimension ==
Shangjing was modelled after Chang'an, the capital of the Tang dynasty. It was about one fifth of the size of Chang'an, measuring 4.68 kilometres (2.91 mi) from east to west, and 3.47 kilometres (2.16 mi) from north to south. It was composed of the outer city, the inner city, and the palace city which enclosed five palaces. It is one of the best preserved medieval capital cities in the world.

== History ==
Balhae was founded at the Dongmo Mountain by Dae Jo-yeong. However, Balhae set up five capitals to rule its territories, and also transferred the main seat of the government several times because stabilizing and strengthening central rule over various ethnic tribes in its realm, which was expanded temporarily. In 756, during the reign of King Mun, Shangjing Longquanfu was established as the permanent capital near Lake Jingpo, south of today's Ning'an, Heilongjiang, China.

== See also ==
- List of provinces of Balhae
