= Ancient Tombs at Longtou Mountain =

Site in Jilin Province, China

- Rungteousan gobungun
- Location within China
- 42.73353°N 129.24413°E
- Type: Cemetery
- Periods: 745–926
- Cultures: Balhae (Bohai)
- Location: Jilin Province
- Region: Helong

History
- Built: 745 CE
- Built by: King Mun

Site notes
- Area: 200,000 km^{2} (77,000 sq mi)
- Architectural style: Stone cist tumuli
- Excavation dates: 1980, 1982, 2005
- Discovered: 1970s

The Ancient Tombs at Longtou Mountain are the burial sites of twelve royal figures from the Balhae (Bohai) kingdom. It is located on Longtou Mountain, southeast of Toudao Town (头道镇) in Helong, Jilin Province, China, a region possibly called the "Western Field of the Ran Valley" (染谷之西原) by the Balhae people. The mausoleum of Princess Chŏnghyo is located here.

== History ==
Construction on the first tombs at Longtou Mountain began sometime after 745, when King Mun moved the Balhae capital city to Junggyeong. The cemetery was in use until the end of the Balhae Kingdom.

The discovery of Princess Chŏnghyo's tombstone resolved speculation amongst scholars that the area was the former location of Hyundeok Province (顯德府) of the Balhae Kingdom.

The site has been a Major Historical and Cultural Site Protected at the National Level since January 13, 1988. The walls and the murals of the tomb have been covered with anti-corrosive chemicals; at one point the tomb included at least one tower, but it is no longer standing.

== Excavation ==
The first excavations at Longtou Mountain were conducted in 1980 by the Yanbian Korean Autonomous Prefecture Museum of Jilin (Chinese: 吉林省延边朝鲜族自治州博物馆). They excavated the Mausoleum of Princess Chŏnghyo in the Dragon Sea section. At the same time, members of the museum, in addition to other organisations, conducted a survey of a 7.5 km^{2} area. Local archaeologists were also invited to conduct test excavations on some of the other tombs, which produced various precious artefacts.

In 1982, the Yanbian Museum excavated seven tombs in the Dragon Sea area. All seven were clustered quite close together, but the tomb roofs had already collapsed. Some tombs cut through older tombs. Two of these tombs contained two people, who had been interred at the same time; four tombs contained two people, who had been interred one after the other; one tomb contained four people, one of whom was first interred, followed by the other three on a separate occasion. In the cases of a secondary burial, the second person was placed on top of the first body's head or feet.

== Layout ==
There are three burial zones:

- Dragon Lake (龍湖)
- Dragon Sea (龍海)
  - The location of Princess Chŏnghyo's mausoleum
  - One robbed-out tumulus to the south-east. The inner north, east, and west walls were plastered, but the tomb had collapsed by 2012.
  - 10 burials distributed over terraces to the east of Princess Chŏnghyo's burial
- Stone Kingdom (石國)

== Mausoleum of Princess Chŏnghyo ==
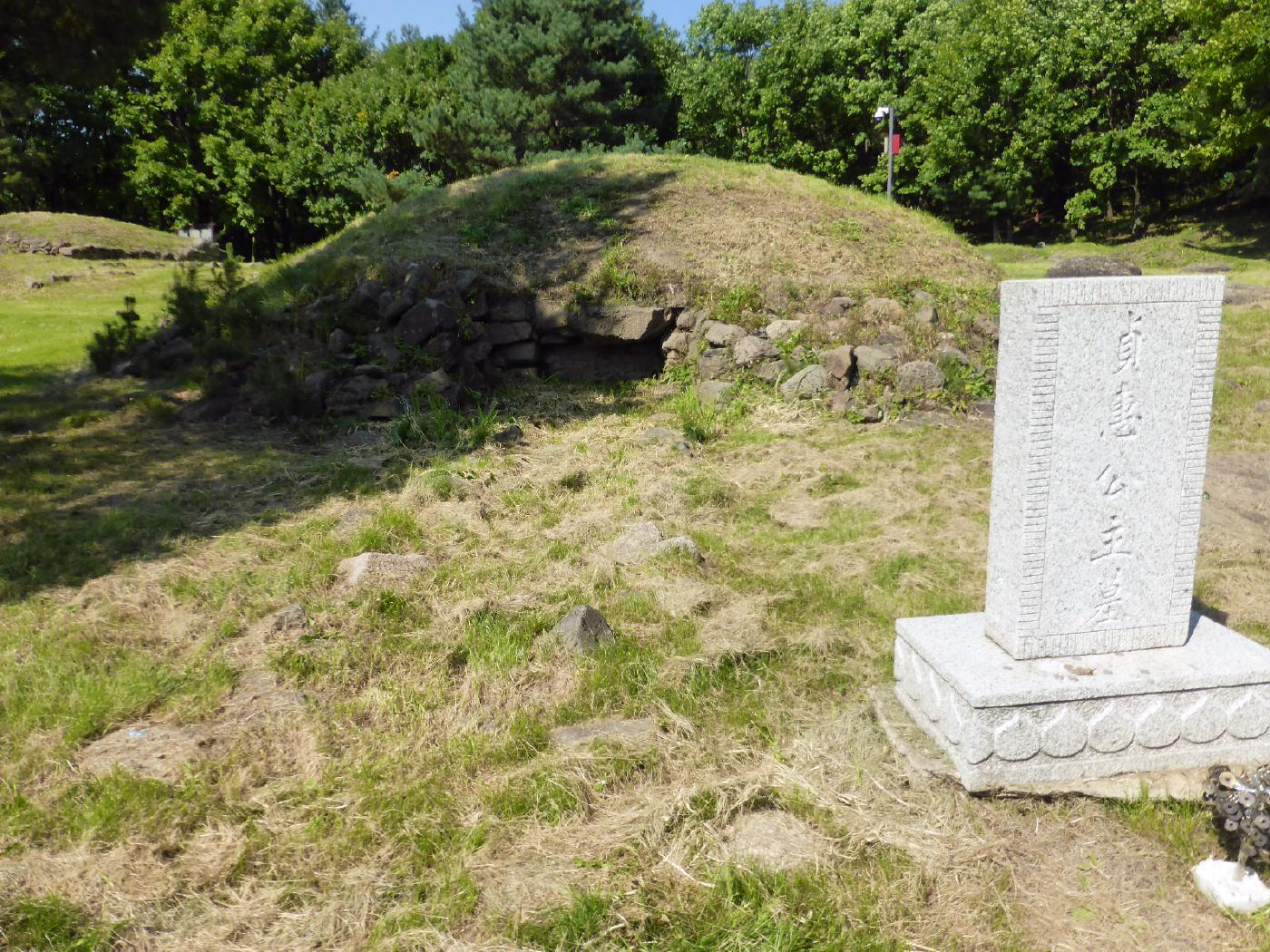
The princess's tomb

The Mausoleum of Princess Chŏnghyo (Chinese: 贞孝公主墓; pinyin: Zhēnxiào Gōngzhǔ mù; Korean: 정효공주묘) was made in 793 by the people of the early Balhae kingdom. The mausoleum contains, among other things, the first complete discovered and detailed murals done by Balhae artists, and hence provides valuable insights to historians.

The mausoleum originally had a funerary pagoda made from brick and stone slabs, in addition to a tumulus. Only the pagoda's foundations remain, which show that it was originally square, measuring 5.50x5.65 m. Below the funerary pagoda and tumulus, the princess' burial comprised an entry passage, tomb entrance, internal passage, and burial chamber. The burial chamber is underground, and was excavated in October 1980. The burial chamber measured 2.10x3.10 m and was built from bricks, with stone slabs forming the roof. The mounds of earth lined with stones demonstrate the continuance of Goguryeo-style tomb but the formal clothing shows Tang style, which implies that Balhae actively accepted the Tang culture. There were originally 12 murals depicting people on the rear walls of the internal passage and north, east, and west walls of the burial chamber. The chamber is surrounded by four murals on each wall, depicting thirteen people in action, such as warriors (3), chamber attendants, musicians, and maids, wearing red, blue, yellow, purple, and brown robes. The murals displayed the image of the Balhae people in its completeness for the first time.

The burial chamber contains a 1.05-metre tall, 0.58-metre width × 0.26-m depth mugui-shaped (土圭) complete and unbroken granite epitaph, on which 728 Chinese characters, in the Regular Script style, are inscribed in 18 horizontal lines. The epitaph is of a typical combined written form, which contained both the chronological writings of the Princess' whole life and the remembrance writings which displayed the praise and remembrance for the Princess. The Balhae scholar author of this epitaph was highly learned in the traditional Chinese literature, as reflected in the use of poetic lines modeled upon poets of the early Tang dynasty.

=== Interments ===
The epitaph explains that Princess Chŏnghyo is the fourth daughter of King Mun, the third ruler of Balhae and a younger sister of Princess Jeonghye (貞惠公主). The epitaph shows that Balhae considered its ruler as an emperor equivalent to that of the Tang dynasty.

The epitaph also recorded that the Princess died on Monday, 6 July 792, during the fifty-sixth year of the Daeheung era. She was accompanied in the burial at Ran Valley (染谷) in Xi Yuan (西原 or Western Plains) in the winter of 809 (已卯) (western Gregorian solar calendar Monday, 11 January 810, Chinese lunar calendar 28th day of the 11th month). She was given the posthumous name "Chŏnghyo" to qualify her as virtuous and filial. She was likely a horse-rider, as the remains of a horse were found in the chamber. The epitaph recorded the year of death as 792. This corrected previous works such as Jin Yufu's (金毓黻) Book of the Balhae Kingdom (渤海國志長編), which recorded 793 instead.

The skeletal remains were scattered all over the chamber when discovered by archaeologists, due to previous looting. However, the looters missed several golden and copper items, jewelry, pottery, and figurines. The gold ornament depicting a three stranded bird's wing is a piece of evidence demonstrating how Balhae was inherited of Goguryeo's crowns. Reconstruction showed that the bones belong to a woman, presumably the princess; but there is also a male, possibly an attendant or child. But family ancestry records do state that the princess married and had a daughter who was born in 782 but died in 787.
