= Northern and Southern States period =

Period in Korean history from 698 to 926

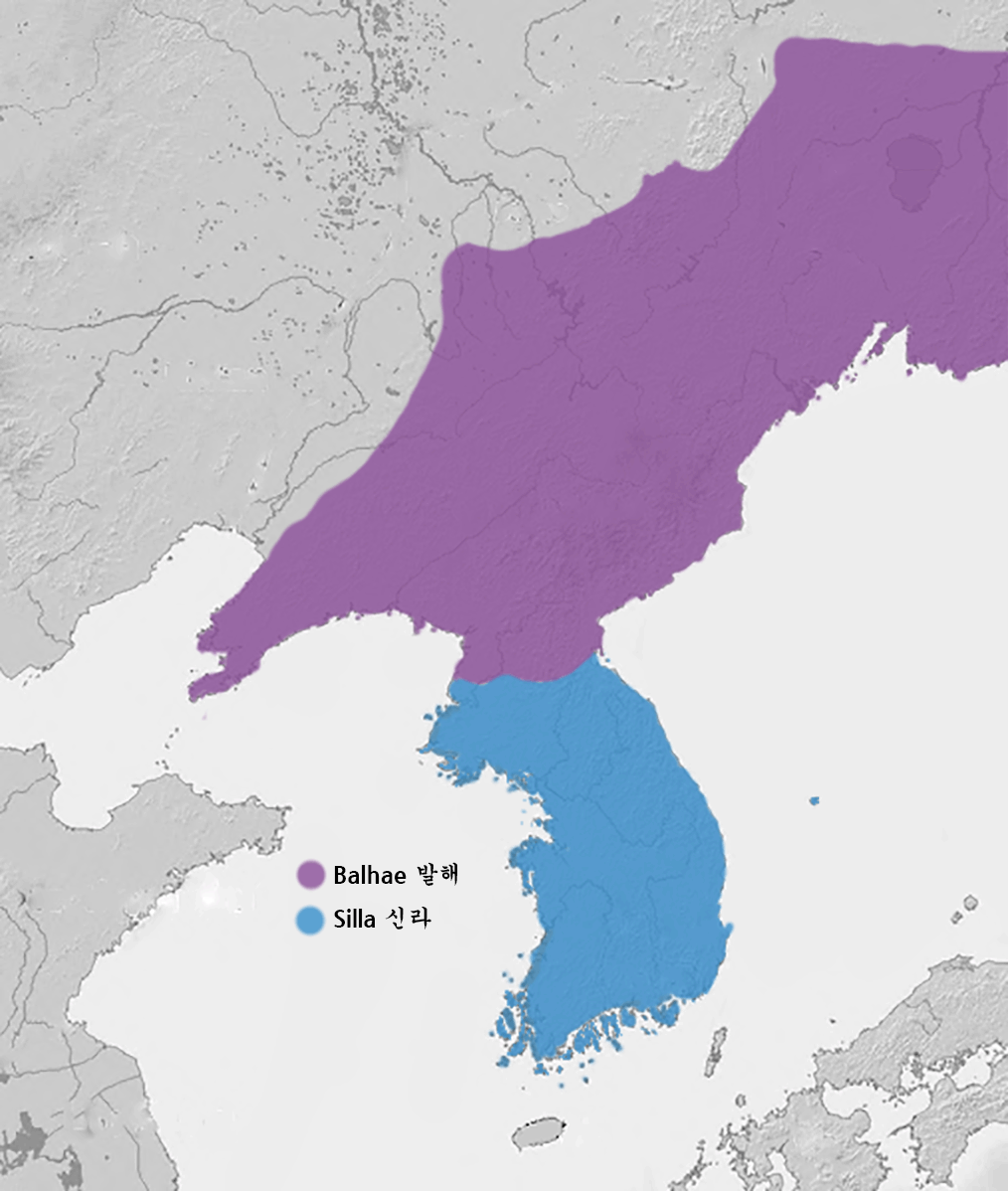

Korean name
- Hangul: 남북국 시대
- Hanja: 南北國時代
- RR: Nambukguk sidae
- MR: Nambukkuk sidae

The Northern and Southern States period (698–926) is the period in Korean history when Unified Silla and Balhae coexisted in the south and north of the peninsula.

== Historiography ==
The Northern and Southern States period is a historical paradigm born out of advocacy for a Korean identity for Balhae and to incorporate it as an integral part of Korean history. The name of the period was coined by Yu Deuk-gong (1749–1807) during the Joseon era. He wrote the Balhaego (Treatise on Balhae) and proposed a new periodization for Korean history in which the Nambukguk sidae ('South–north states period') replaced the Unified Silla period (668–935). The reason for this was that he believed that the loss of Manchuria was the primary reason for Joseon's decline. This line of thinking was continued by I Jonghwi, who wrote the Dongsa (Eastern History).

In the 1960s, the North Korean scholar Pak Se-yong argued that Balhae was "a part of Korean history", "a state founded by people of Koguryŏ", and that its territory was "composed of most of the former territory of Koguryŏ and an expansive, newly acquired portion". Pak made broader claims on the continuity of Balhae with modern Korea, contending that "bloodline and culture are an important component of the bloodlines and cultural traditions of the Korean race". Based on findings of joint Chinese-North Korean archaeological excavations in the 1960s, Chu Yŏnghŏn advocated for a Korean identity for Balhae in South Korea. These efforts led to the incorporation of Balhae into Korean history as part of the "Northern and Southern Dynasties" based on instances in which the Silla court referred to Balhae as the "northern court". According to this narrative, Goryeo was the first unification of Korea, since Balhae co-existed with Unified Silla while occupying former Goguryeo territory north of the Korean peninsula.

Acceptance of this new narrative was not immediate. In 1981 a South Korean scholar called the Northern–Southern Dynasties an "interesting new interpretation", and as late as 1990 there was still no consensus. However, by now the Northern–Southern Dynasties paradigm is widely accepted in South Korean academia. According to Kim Eun Gug, the adoption of this position was necessary to counter Chinese claims on Goguryeo and Balhae as part of Chinese history as well as to provide a model for North and South Korea's unification. Kim openly declared that "We have a national responsibility to develop a response to China’s Northeast Project and its claims that Koguryŏ and Parhae belong to Chinese history."

== Unified Silla ==
After the unification wars, the Tang dynasty established territories in the former Goguryeo, and began to administer and establish communities in Baekje. Silla attacked the Chinese in Baekje and northern Korea in 671.

The Tang dynasty then invaded Silla in 674 but Silla defeated the Tang army in the north. Silla drove the Tang forces out of the peninsula by 676 to achieve unification of most of the Three Kingdoms.

Unified Silla was a golden age of art and culture, and Buddhism became a large part of Silla culture. Buddhist monasteries such as the Bulguksa are examples of advanced Korean architecture and Buddhist influence. State-sponsored art and architecture from this period include Hwangnyongsa Temple, Bunhwangsa Temple, and Seokguram Grotto, a World Heritage Site.

Unified Silla carried on the maritime prowess of Baekje, which acted like the Phoenicia of medieval East Asia, and during the 8th and 9th centuries dominated the seas of East Asia and the trade between China, Korea and Japan, most notably during the time of Chang Pogo; in addition, Silla people made overseas communities in China on the Shandong Peninsula and the mouth of the Yangtze River. Unified Silla was a prosperous and wealthy country, and its metropolitan capital of Gyeongju was the fourth largest city in the world.

Buddhism flourished during this time, and many Korean Buddhists gained great fame among Chinese Buddhists and contributed to Chinese Buddhism, including: Woncheuk, Wonhyo, Uisang, Musang, and Kim Gyo-gak, a Silla prince whose influence made Mount Jiuhua one of the Four Sacred Mountains of Chinese Buddhism.

Silla began to experience political troubles in the late 9th century. This severely weakened Silla and soon thereafter, descendants of the former Baekje established Later Baekje. In the north, rebels revived Goguryeo, beginning the Later Three Kingdoms period.

Unified Silla lasted for 267 years until, under King Gyeongsun, it was annexed by Goryeo in 935.

== Balhae ==
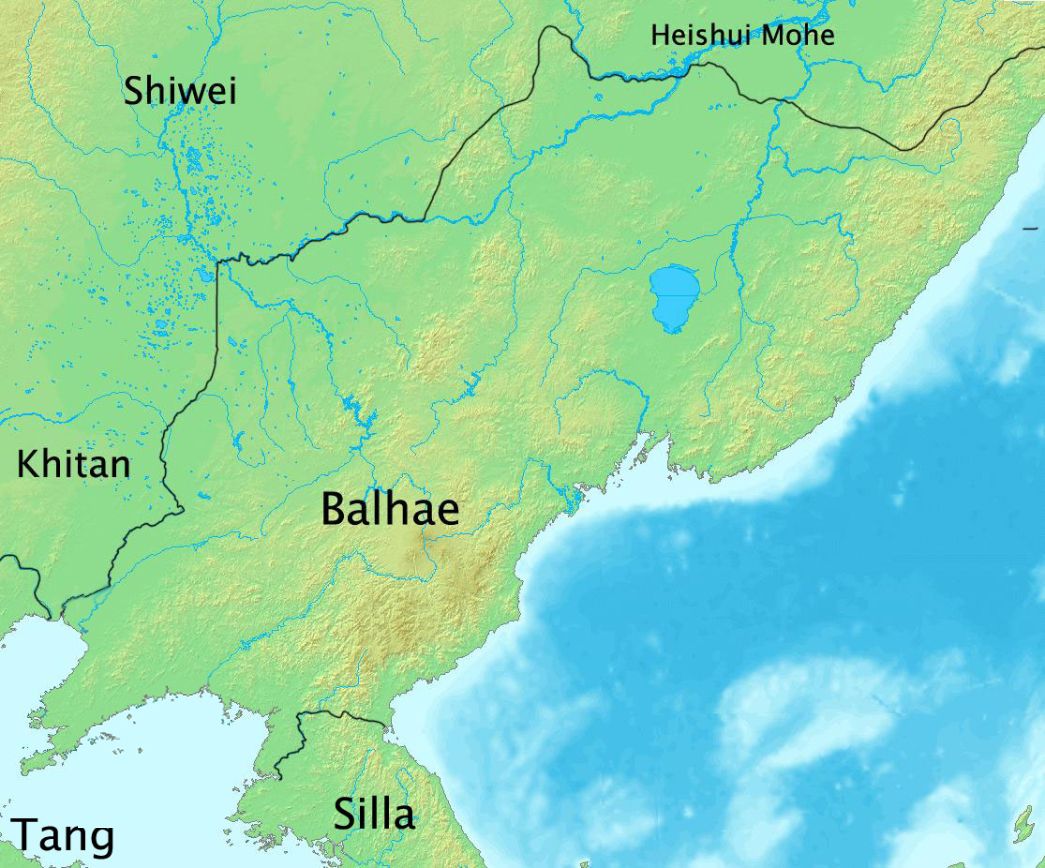
Balhae and Silla in 830

Balhae was founded after Goguryeo had fallen. Its name was another transcribed version of Mohe, a Tungus Tribe speaking a language like Manchurian and Sibe. It was founded in the northern part of former lands of Goguryeo by Dae Joyeong, a former Goguryeo general or chief of Sumo Mohe, after defeating the military of central government of Tang dynasty at the Battle of Tianmenling. Balhae controlled the northern areas of the Korean Peninsula, much of Manchuria, and expanded into present-day Russian Maritime Province.

In a time of relative peace and stability in the region, Balhae flourished in culture, especially during the long reign of the third King Mun (r. 737–793) and King Seon. At that time, Balhae was a culturally advanced country, so that even China referred to this kingdom as "a prosperous country of the East". However, Balhae was severely weakened by the 10th century, and the Khitan Liao dynasty conquered Balhae in 926. Goryeo absorbed some of Balhae's territory and received Balhae refugees, including the crown prince and the royal family, but compiled no known histories of Balhae.

== Language ==
Due to the lack of linguistic evidence, it is difficult to make a definitive conclusion for the linguistic relation between the Balhae and Silla languages.

One terminology that people of Balhae used to describe "a king" is Gadokbu (transcribed as 可毒夫) where 'gadok' can be interpreted to mean 'holy' in middle Korean and 'bu' being a general suffix for titles found in Silla and Goguryeo meaning 'person'. It is alternatively to be related to the Manchurian verb 'kadalambi' meaning 'to rule'.

== See also ==
- History of Korea
- Military history of Korea

== Bibliography ==
- Ch'oe, Yŏng-ho (1980), "An Outline History of Korean Historiography", Korean Studies, 4: 1–27, JSTOR 23717670
- Shin, Michael D., ed. (2014), Korean History in Maps, Cambridge University Press, pp. 64–65, ISBN 978-1-107-09846-6
- Sloane, Jesse D. (2014), Parhae in Historiography and Archaeology: International Debate and Prospects for Resolution
- Xu, Stella (2016), Reconstructing Ancient Korean History: The Formation of Korean-ness in the Shadow of History, Lexington Books
