= Mu of Balhae =

2nd King of Balhae (r. 719–737)

Chinese name
- Chinese: 武王
Transcriptions
Standard Mandarin
- Hanyu Pinyin: Wǔwáng
- Wade–Giles: Wuwang

Birth name in Chinese
- Chinese: 大武艺
Transcriptions
Standard Mandarin
- Hanyu Pinyin: Dà Wǔyì
- Wade–Giles: Ta Wui

Korean name
- Hangul: 무왕
- Hanja: 武王
Transcriptions
- Revised Romanization: Mu wang
- McCune–Reischauer: Mu wang

Birth name in Korean
- Hangul: 대무예
- Hanja: 大武藝
Transcriptions
- Revised Romanization: Dae Muye
- McCune–Reischauer: Tae Muye

King Mu (Korean: 무왕; Hanja: 武王) (r. 719–737), also called Tae Muye (대무예; 大武藝), was the second king of the Balhae. He is noted for the military expansion of his domain.

== Background ==
Tae Muye was the eldest son of Tae Choyŏng, the founder of the ancient kingdom of Balhae, He ascended to the throne after the death in 719 of his father. He was given the title of "King of the Kyeru Province" by Tang Emperor Xuanzong. He gave the posthumous title King Go to his father, Tae Choyŏng. Since then, He declared the era name Inan, an act of independence from China's Tang dynasty. On the other hand, he frequently sent embassies to the Tang, including his sons and brothers.

== Reign ==
Balhae's aggressive expansion triggered frictions with Tang China, Silla of southern Korea, the Khitans, the Xi, the Göktürks, and several Mohe tribes. When the Heishui Mohe in the north of Balhae came under the direct control of the Tang in 727, he attacked the Heishui Mohe fearing a pincer attack.

732, King Mu ordered a punitive expedition against Tang in present-day Shandong, sending the Balhae navy at the command of Chang Munhyu. In the same year, he led troops to Madushan (馬都山) in the vicinity of Shanhaiguan and occupied nearby towns. In 733, Chinese Emperor Xuanzong ordered Tae Munye to attack Balhae, along with forces from Silla, but the attack was unsuccessful and they were repelled.

In 727, Balhae began to dispatch embassies to Japan to avoid international isolation. The king sent an official document to Japan indicating that Balhae recovered the terrain of Goguryeo and succeeded to the culture of Buyeo. Japan, whose relationship with Silla was strained, welcomed them as a revival of Goguryeo.

In 732, He made an assault on Tang empire's Dengzhou. During the assault, the local governor of Dengzhou Wei Jun was killed. The assault was mostly an act of piracy and did not elevate to an international conflict until Wei's death. Later, Tang, allied with Silla, invaded Balhae but the advance of the allied troops was deterred by heavy snow.

Mu was succeeded by his son Dae Heummu in 737.

== See also ==
- List of Korean monarchs
- History of Korea

Mu of Balhae House of Tae Died: 737
Regnal titles
Preceded by Ko	King of Balhae; 719–737	Succeeded by Mun
