= Zarubino =

Zarubino may refer to:

- Zarubino, Primorsky Krai, an urban-type settlement in Primorsky Krai, Russia
- Zarubino, Novgorod Oblast, a former urban-type settlement in Novgorod Oblast, Russia; since 2004—a village (selo)
- Zarubino, name of several rural localities in Russia
