= List of provinces of Balhae =

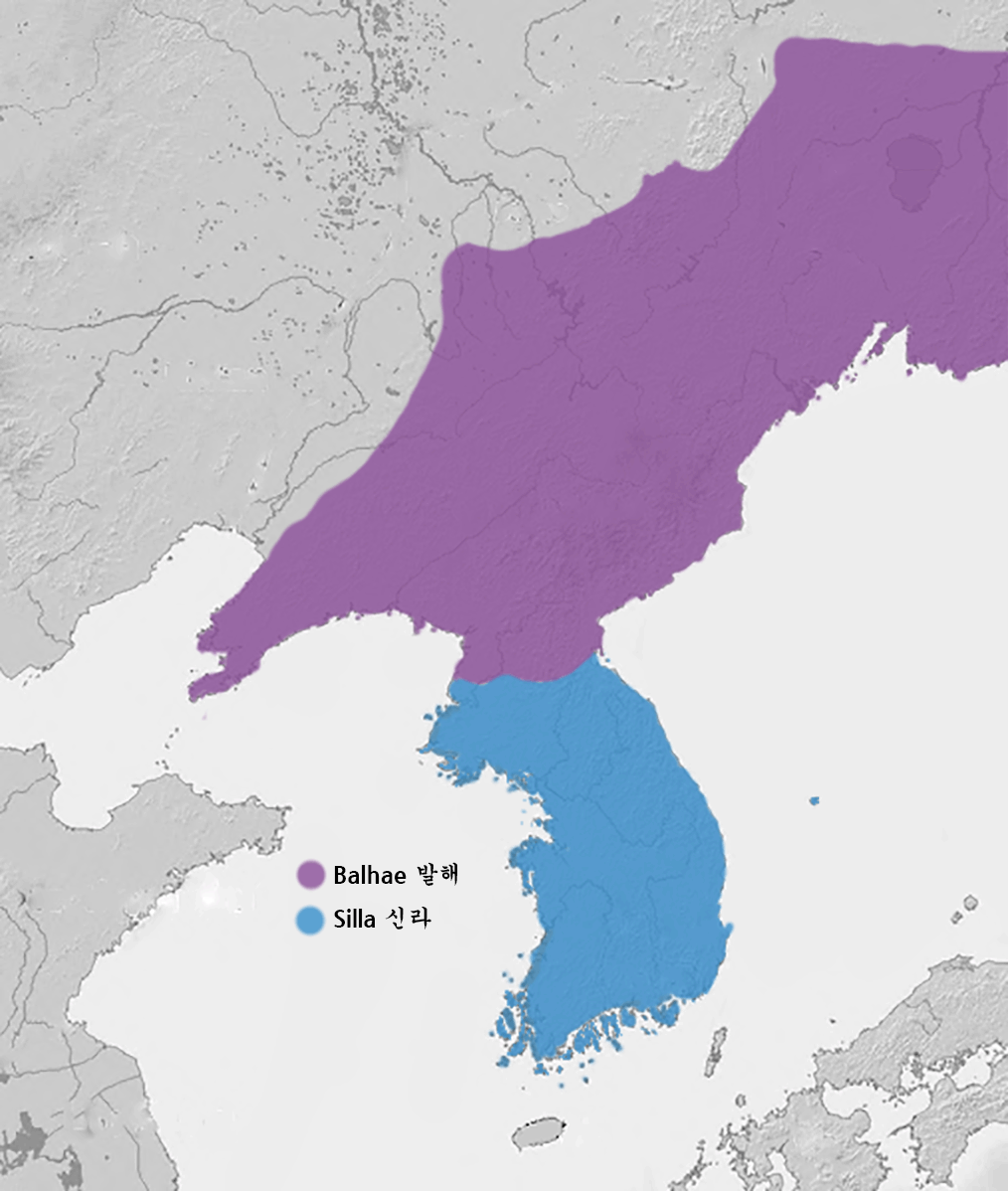
Balhae

The Balhae (or Bohai) kingdom controlled the northern Korean Peninsula, the area from the Amur River (Heilong Jiang) to the Strait of Tartary, and the Liaodong Peninsula. Similar to the workings of the Chinese Tang dynasty, the administration system of the Balhae kingdom was composed of:

- 5 capitals: a Supreme capital with four secondary capitals
- 15 provinces; and
- 62 prefectures.

== Table of provinces ==
Former State	Province			Capitals/Ancient name				Prefectures level 속주(屬州)
Former State	Hanja	Hangul	RR, Pinyin	Hanja	Hangul	RR, Pinyin	Modern location	Prefectures level 속주(屬州)
Sushen 숙신 肅愼	龍泉府	용천부	Yongcheon; Longquan	上京/龍州	상경/용주	Sanggyeong/Yongju; Shangjing/Longzhou	Ning'an (寧安市) (Manchu: Ninguta 寧古塔)	용주(龍州): the capital of the Bohai Kingdom. Having eight counties under its jurisdiction: 永寧、豐水、扶羅、長平、富利、佐慕、肅慎、永平. The seat was near present-day Ning'an.; 호주(湖州): Having one county under its jurisdiction: 長慶. Southwest of Ning'an County, northwest of Jingpo Lake; 발주(渤州). having one county under its jurisdiction: 貢珍. Its seat was located in the northeast of present-day Ning'an City, on the east bank of the Mudan River, or in the northwest of present-day Linkou County.
Sushen 숙신 肅愼	顯德府	현덕부	Hyundeok; Xiande	中京/顯州	중경/현주	Junggyeong/Hyeonju; Zhongjing/Xianzhou	Helong/Dunhua (和龍市/敦化市)	노주(盧州) = Antu County (山陽、杉盧、漢陽、白岩、霜岩); 현주(顕州); 철주(鐵州); 탕주(湯州) = 靈峰縣 (now in Emu, Dunhua City), (靈峰、常豐、白石、均谷、嘉利); 영주(榮州) = Xigucheng (西古城) in Helong City (崇山、溈水、綠城); 흥주(興州) = Baihe; 涑州（獨奏州）= Tuchengzi Manchu and Korean Township (Changyi District, Jilin City)
Yemaek 예맥 濊貊	龍原府	용원부	Yongwon; Longyuan	東京/慶州	동경/경주	Donggyeong/Gyeongju; Dongjing/Qingzhou	Hunchun	경주(慶州) = Baliancheng (Hunchun). Having three counties under its jurisdiction: 龍原、永安 (now Ying'an Town, Hunchun)、壁谷 (now in Chunhua Town, Hunchun); 염주(鹽州) = Zarubino. The seat was in 龍河縣 (now Kraskino). Having four counties under its jurisdiction: 海陽、接海、格川、龍河.; 목주(穆州): The seat was in 會農縣 (now Ryongbung-lodongjagu, Kyongwon County, North Korea) 하주(賀州): Having four counties under its jurisdiction: 洪賀、送誠、吉理、石山
Okjeo 옥저 沃沮	南海府	남해부	Namhae; Nanhai	南京/沃州	남경/옥주	Namgyeong/Okju; Nanjing/Wozhou	Hamheung	옥주(沃州): Having four counties under its jurisdiction: 沃沮、鷲岩、龍山、濱海、昇平、靈泉. The seat was in 沃沮縣 (today Hamhung, North Korea. Another theory is that it is located in Namsansŏng (南山城), Kyongsong County and Pukchong County.; 정주(睛州): Having five counties under its jurisdiction: 天睛、神陽、蓮池、狼山、仙岩. The seat was in 天睛縣 (today Kujin (구진/舊津) northwest of Hamhung).; 초주(椒州): Having five counties under its jurisdiction:椒山、貂嶺、澌泉、尖山、岩淵. The seat was in 東山城裡, Maengsan County)
Goguryeo 고구려 高句麗	鴨綠府	압록부	Amnok; Yalü	西京/神州	서경/신주	Seogyeong/Sinju; Xijing/Shenzhou	Linjiang	신주(神州): Having three counties under its jurisdiction:神鹿、神化、劍門. The seat was in 神鹿縣 (today Huludao Village (葫蘆套村), southwest of Linjiang City.); 환주(桓州). The seat was in 桓都縣 (today Jian).; 풍주(豊州) = Today Hyesan and Changbai Korean Autonomous County. Having four counties under its jurisdiction: 安豐、渤恪、隰壤、硤石. The seat was in 安豐.; 정주(正州). The seat was in Fu'er River basin in Tonghua. Having one county under its jurisdiction: 東那縣.
Goguryeo 고구려 高句麗	長嶺府	장령부	Jangnyeong; Changling	瑕州	하주	Haju; Xiazhou	Jingyu (靖宇县)	하주(瑕州): The seat was in Sumigouxiang (蘇密溝鄉), Huadian (Jilin).; 하주(河州): The seat was in Shancheng town (山城鎮), Maihekou.
Buyeo 부여 夫餘	夫餘府	부여부	Buyeo; Fuyu	扶州	부주	Buju; Fuzhou	Kaiyuan	부주(扶州): The seat was in 扶餘縣 (today Yimian City (一面城) of Siping). It has jurisdiction over four counties: 扶餘、布多、長平、永平.; 선주(仙州): The seat was in Chengzishan Mountain City (城子山山城) in Xifeng County, Liaoning. It has jurisdiction over three counties: 強師（帥）、新安、漁谷..
Buyeo 부여 夫餘	鄚頡府	막힐부	Makhil; Moxie	鄚州	막주	Makju; Mozhou	Acheng (阿城)	막주(鄚州): The seat was located in 奧喜 (present-day Acheng District, Harbin, Heilongjiang Province).; 고주(高州): The seat was located in present-day Niaohexiang (鳥河鄉), Bin County, Heilongjiang Province.
읍루 揖婁/우루부말갈 虞婁部靺鞨	定理府	정리부	Jeongni; Dingli	定州	정주	Jeongju/Dingzhou	Partizansk	정주(定州): The seat was located in Sandaohezi (三道河子) on the lower reaches of Mudanjiang River in Hailin City. Another theory is that it was located in Partizansk, Russia. It has jurisdiction over five counties: 定理、平邱、岩城、慕美、安夷.; 반주(潘州): The seat was located in present-day Wudaohezitun (五道河子屯) in Sandaotong Town (三道通鎮), Linkou. It has jurisdiction over four counties: 潘水、安定、保山、能利.
읍루 揖婁/우루부말갈 虞婁部靺鞨	安邊府	안변부	Anbyeon; Anbian	安州	안주	Anju; Anzhou	Olga	안주(安州): Present-day Olga, Russia.; 경주(瓊州)
솔빈 率賓	率賓府	솔빈부	Solbin; Shuaibin	華州	화주	Hwaju; Huazhou	Ussuriysk/Shuaibin	화주(華州): The seat is now in Ussuriysk, Russia). Another theory is that it was located in Dachengzi Village (大城子村), Dongning County, Heilongjiang Province. 익주(益州): The seat was in Bohai Ancient City near Vladivostok, and its jurisdiction was in the Suifen River basin.; 건주(建州): Is located in Dachengzi Ancient City (大城子古城), Dongning City, Heilongjiang Province. It is also said that it was in Krasnyi Yar village near Ussuriysk. on the other side of the Suifen River.
불열 拂涅	東平府	동평부	Dongpyeong; Dongping	伊州	이주	Iju; Yizhou	Dangbi (密山市/当壁鎮)	이주(伊州) 몽주(蒙州) 타주(沱州)=Troitskoye 흑주(黑州) 비주(比州)
철리 鐵利	鐵利府	철리부	Cheolli; Tieli	德理鎮	덕리진	Deongnijin/Delizhen	Yilan (依蘭郷)	광주(廣州) 분주(汾州) 포주(蒲州) 해주(海州) 귀주(歸州)
월희 越喜	懷遠府	회원부	Hoewon; Huaiyuan	達州	달주	Dalju	Tongjiang (同江市)	달주(達州) 월주(越州) 회주(懷州) 기주(紀州) 부주(富州) 미주(美州) 복주(福州) 사주(邪州) 지주(芝州)
월희 越喜	安遠府	안원부	Anyuan; Anwon	寧州	영주	Yeongju; Ningzhou	Dalnerechensk	영주(寧州) 미주(郿州)=Spassk-Dalny 모주(慕州) 상주(常州)

== Former Balhae provinces ==
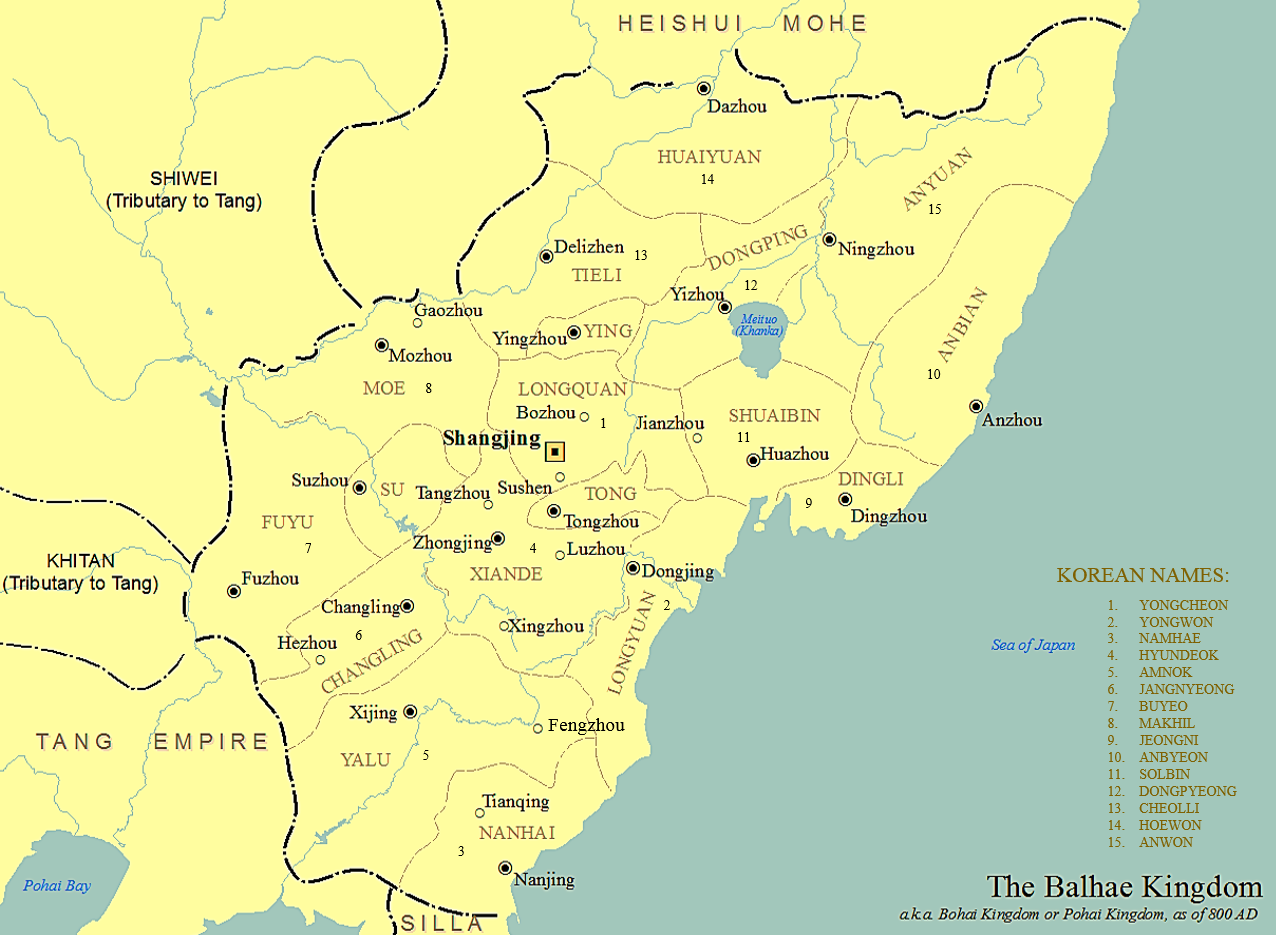
Administrative map of Balhae

Manzhou Yuanliu Kao provides records which show that the Balhae had occupied the Bisa Fortress (비사성) at the southern tip of the Liaodong Peninsula. The History of Liao records that the Balhae established provinces at the Sin Fortress (신성), Gaemo Fortress (개모성), Baegam Fortress (백암성), Yodong Fortress (요동성) and Ansi Fortress (안시성) area in Liaodong, as well as a substantial portion of the Liaoxi area. The Balhae sovereign's message to Yamato Kingdom in 796 states that it has recovered the entire old Goguryeo territory and its ruler's authority now shines beyond the Liao River. The Balhae came to occupy the Songhua and Wusuli River basins as well as the whole adjoining coastal zone along the Sea of Japan (East Sea).

- 약홀주(若忽州) (present-day Dandong)
- 목저주(木底州) (present-day Yewutai (葉武臺), Faku County, Liaoning Province, near the Taizi River)
- 현도주 (玄兎州) (near present-day Manzhouli)

== Correspondence ==
- Balhae Provinces coming from Andong protectorate (안동도호부) :
  - Namhae province is corresponding to former Qusu (Hangul: 거소주 Hanja/Hanzi :去素州), Qudan (Hangul: 거단주 Hanja/Hanzi :去旦州), 식리주(識利州)
  - Wolhui province is corresponding to former Yuexi (Hangul: 월희주 Hanja/Hanzi :越喜州)
  - Dongpyeong is corresponding to former Funie 불열주(拂涅州)
  - Jangnyung is corresponding to former 제북주(諸北州)
  - Yalu is corresponding to former 안시주(安市州) and 창암주(倉巖州)
  - Hoewon is corresponding to former 연진주(延津州)
  - Hyeondeok is corresponding to former 여산주(黎山州)

== See also ==
- List of Provinces of Liao
- Parhae
