= Mun of Balhae =

3rd King of Balhae (r. 737–793)

Chinese name
- Chinese: 文王
Transcriptions
Standard Mandarin
- Hanyu Pinyin: Wénwáng
- Wade–Giles: Wun Wang

Birth name in Chinese
- Chinese: 大钦茂
Transcriptions
Standard Mandarin
- Hanyu Pinyin: Dà Qīnmào
- Wade–Giles: Ta Ch'in Mao

Korean name
- Hangul: 문왕
- Hanja: 文王
Transcriptions
- Revised Romanization: Mun wang
- McCune–Reischauer: Mun wang

Birth name in Korean
- Hangul: 대흠무
- Hanja: 大欽茂
Transcriptions
- Revised Romanization: Dae Heummu
- McCune–Reischauer: Tae Hŭmmu

Mun (Korean: 문; Hanja: 文; 715–793; r. 737–793), also known as Tae Hŭmmu, was the third and longest-reigning ruler of the Balhae. He succeeded his father King Mu, upon his death in 737. He was the grandson of Tae Choyŏng, the founder of Balhae.

== Reign ==
During King Mun's reign, diplomatic ties with the Tang dynasty were established, and many Balhae scholars went to the Tang to study, extending the influence of Buddhism and Confucianism in Balhae's governance. He also strengthened relations with Silla, which unified the Korean Peninsula to the south of Balhae, overseeing the development of the trade route called Silla-road (신라도; 新羅道). Balhae also increased diplomacy and trade with Japan.

King Mun moved the capital of Balhae several times (Sanggyeong and Donggyeong), stabilizing and strengthening central rule over various ethnic tribes in his realm, which was expanded temporarily. He also authorized the creation of the Chujagam (주자감; 胄子監), the national academy, based on the national academy of Tang.

Although the Tang dynasty recognized him as a king, Balhae itself referred to him as the Taehŭng poryŏk hyogam kŭmnyun sŏngbŏp taewang (Korean: 대흥보력효감금륜성법대왕, 大興寶曆孝感金輪聖法大王), Kadokpu (가독부; 可毒夫), Seongwang (성왕; 聖王) and Kiha (기하; 基下), Balhae itself referred to him as the posterity of heaven and an emperor.

The tomb of his fourth daughter, Princess Chŏnghyo, was discovered in 1980. The tombstone of his elder daughter, Princess Chŏnghye, has also been found.

== Era names ==
- Taehŭng (대흥; 大興; lit. 'Great Happiness', 737-774, ? – 793)
- Poryŏk (보력; 寶曆, 774-?, at latest until 781)

== Family ==
- Father: King Mu (685–737)
  - Younger brother: Tae Wŏnŭi (735–793)
- Wife: Empress Hyoŭi (715–?)
  - First daughter (732); died prematurely
  - Princess Chŏnghye (737–777), second daughter
  - Tae Koengnim (대굉림; 大宏臨; 745–780) – father of King Sŏng, first son
  - Third daughter (?-?)
  - Tae Chŏngal (대정알; 大貞斡; 747–?), second son
  - Tae Ch'ŏngyun (대청윤; 大淸允; 748–?), third son
  - King Kang (750–809), fourth son
  - Princess Chǒnghyo (정효공주; 貞孝公主; 757–792), fourth daughter

== See also ==
- List of Korean monarchs
- History of Korea

Mun of Balhae House of Tae Died: 793
Regnal titles
Preceded by Mu	King of Balhae; 737–793	Succeeded by Tae Wŏnŭi
