= Heishui Mohe =

Ancient ethnic group

The Heishui Mohe (Chinese: 黑水靺鞨; pinyin: Hēishuǐ Mòhé; Manchu: Sahaliyan i Aiman or 薩哈廉部; Korean: 흑수말갈; RR: Heuksu malgal), rendered in English as Blackriver Mohe or Blackwater Mohe, were a tribe of Mohe people in Outer Manchuria along the Amur River (Chinese: 黑水; pinyin: Hēi Shuǐ; lit. 'Blackwater" or "Black River') in what is now Russia's Khabarovsk Krai, Amur Oblast, Jewish Autonomous Oblast, and Heilongjiang in China.

== History ==
The southern Heishui Mohe were subjects of King Seon (King Xuan) of Balhae (Bohai). Balhae was conquered by the Khitan-led Liao dynasty in AD 926. The Heishui Mohe are sometimes linked with the Jurchen who established China's Jin dynasty in the 10th century and who later formed the core of the Manchus who established the Qing dynasty in the 17th century. (Note: For example, by Huang.) The Jurchen inhabited the forests and river valleys of the land which is now divided between China's Heilongjiang Province and Russia's Maritime Province, outside the range of the Blackriver Mohe, and such links remain conjectural.

== Culture ==
The Mohe enjoyed eating pork, practiced pig farming extensively, and were mainly sedentary, and also used both pig and wolf skins for coats. They were predominantly farmers and grew soybean, wheat, millet, and rice, in addition to engaging in hunting.

== Archaeological exploration ==
Modern archaeologists on both sides of the Amur/Heilongjiang River have made a number of conclusions about the correspondence of the discovered archaeological cultures to the ethnic groups known from ancient records. According to Russian archaeologists, prior to about the second half of the 7th century AD the Lesser Khingan mountain range formed a natural boundary between two groups of archaeological cultures. West of the range, the Talakan Culture (талаканская культура) was succeeded by the Mikhailovskaya Culture (михайловская культура), which has been identified with the Mongolic-speaking Shiwei people. East of the range, the Poltsevo culture and the Naifeld group, also known as the Tongzhen culture based on the findings on the Chinese side of the river) of the Mohe culture was found; the latter was identified with the Tungusic Heishui Mohe people.

According to the archaeological evidence, during the late 7th century through 10th century AD, some Naifeld-Culture Heishui Mohe migrated west of the range (to the section of the Amur Valley west of the Bureya River, and possibly also into the Nen River basin), absorbing the indigenous population of the area (which is evidenced e.g. by the presence of the ornaments associated with the autochthonous Mikhailovskaya Culture on the ceramics of the Neifeld [Heishui Mohe] people who had migrated into the Mikhailovskaya's former area). Modern researchers surmise that the migration of some of the Mohe people west of the range during the late 7th - early 8th century may have been caused by the pressure from the Balhae further south.

Another Mohe group, the Sumo Mohe from the Sungari Valley migrated to the Western Amur Valley at roughly the same time as well. Which Mohe group arrived to the region first remains the subject of a dispute, hinging on radiocarbon and stratigraphic dating of various sites.

There is some archaeological evidence for the migration of the Sumo Mohe to the northeast, to the coast of the Sea of Okhotsk as well, namely, apparent influence of the Neifeld Culture found in the ceramics of the Tokarevo Culture of the latter region.

== Chieftains ==
- Nishuliji (Sinicized: 倪屬利稽, pinyin: Níshǔlìjī) around 722.
- Gao Ziluo / Go Jara (Sinicized: 高子羅, pinyin: Gāo Zǐluó), defected to Goryeo with 170 men in February 921.
- A-gu-lang / A-eo-han (Sinicized: 阿於閒, pinyin: Āyúxián), defected to Goryeo with 200 men in April 921.
- Adoutuofu / Adutabul (Sinicized: 阿豆陀弗), paid tribute to Hyeonjong of Goryeo in 1021.

== See also ==
- Mohe people
- Mohe, Heilongjiang - city in contemporary China
- History of Manchuria
- Balhae
