= Parhae =

7th-10th century kingdom in East Asia

Parhae (Balhae) / Bohai (Pohai) 渤海 (Korean) (Hanja) 발해 (Hangul) Parhae, Balhae 渤海 (Chinese) Bóhǎi
- 698–926
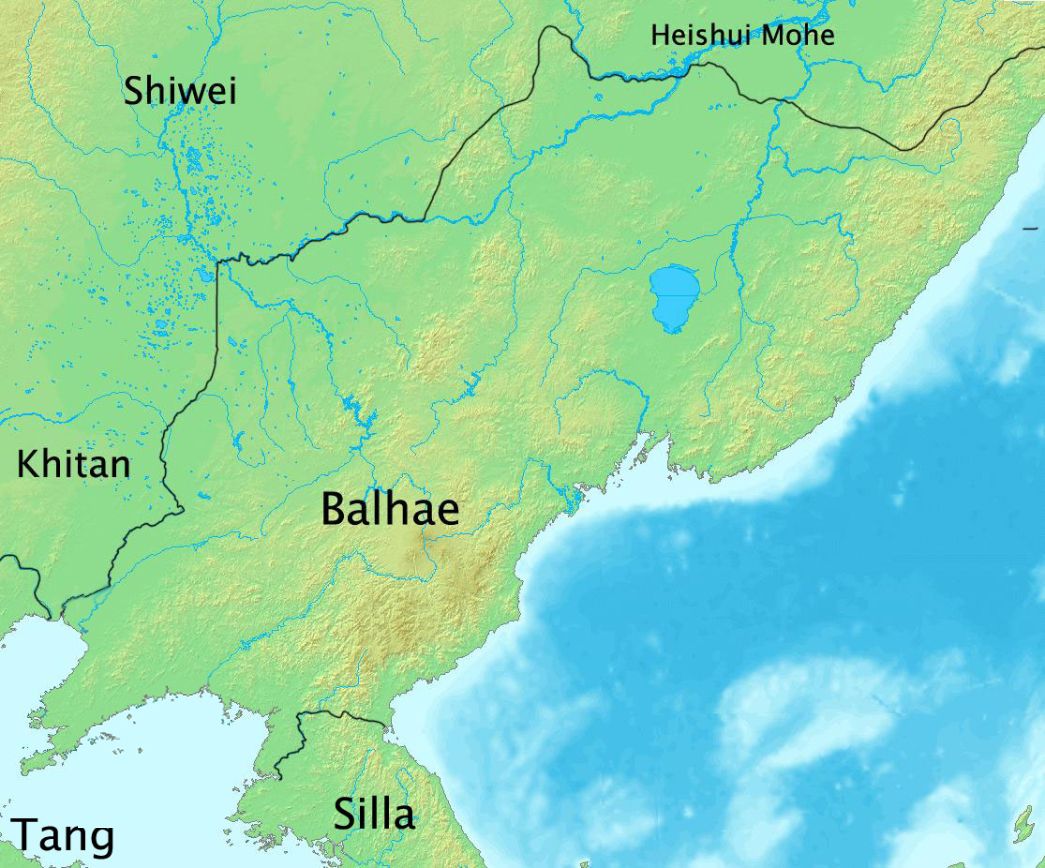
- The territory of Parhae in 830, during the reign of King Sŏn (Xuan) of Parhae.
- Capital: Dongmo Mountain (698–742); Central capital (742–756); Upper capital (756–785); Eastern capital (785–793); Upper capital (793–926) (Note: With the multiple capitals system; a Supreme capital with four secondary capitals (c.820-926))
- Common languages: Parhae
- Other languages: Goguryeo (Koreanic), Tungusic languages, Classical Chinese (literary)
- Religion: Buddhism, Shamanism, Confucianism
- Government: Monarchy
- King
  - 698–719: Go (Gao) (first)
  - 719–737: Mu (Wu)
  - 737–793: Mun (Wen)
  - 818–830: Sŏn (Xuan)
  - 907–926: Tae Insŏn (Da Yinzhuan) (last)
- History
  - Tae Chungsang begins military campaigns: 696
  - Establishment in Tianmenling: 698
  - "Parhae" as a kingdom name: 713
  - Fall of Sang-gyeong: 14 January 926

Population
  - 10th century: 1.5–4 million
Preceded by
Goguryeo
Mohe Peoples
Succeeded by
Liao dynasty
Dongdan
Goryeo
Later Parhae
Jurchens
- Today part of: China; North Korea; Russia

Korean name
- Hangul: 발해
- Hanja: 渤海
- RR: Balhae
- MR: Parhae
- IPA: [paɽɦɛ]

Alternate Korean name
- Hangul: 진국
- Hanja: 震國
- RR: Jinguk
- MR: Chin'guk
- IPA: [tɕinguk̚]

Chinese name
- Chinese: 渤海
Transcriptions
Standard Mandarin
- Hanyu Pinyin: Bóhǎi
- Wade–Giles: Po-hai

Manchu name
- Manchu script: ᡦᡠᡥᠠ‍ᡳ
- Romanization: Puhai

Russian name
- Russian: Бохай
- Romanization: Bokhay

Parhae, (Note: Korean: 발해; Chinese: 渤海; Russian: Бохай; Manchu: ᡦᡠᡥᠠ‍ᡳ) also rendered as Bohai or Balhae, and called Jin (Note: Korean: 진국; Hanja: 震國) early on, was a multiethnic kingdom established in 698 by Tae Choyŏng (Da Zuorong). It was originally known as the Kingdom of Jin (震, Zhen) until 713, when its name was changed to Parhae. At its greatest extent it corresponded to what is today Northeast China, the northern half of the Korean Peninsula and the southeastern Russian Far East.

There are differing accounts of Parhae's founding, but most of them state that when Parhae was founded by Tae Choyŏng in 698, it involved Goguryeo and Mohe people. Parhae's early history was marked by a rocky relationship with the Tang dynasty, characterized by military and political conflict, but by the end of the 8th century the relationship had become cordial and friendly. The Tang dynasty would eventually recognize Parhae as the "Prosperous Country in the East".

Parhae's culture has been described as similar to, derived from, or affiliated with Goguryeo, Mohe, Khitan, and Tang cultural elements. However the exact nature of Parhae's relationship to these cultures is disputed. Parhae adopted some of the Tang's administrative systems like Three Departments and Six Ministries. Parhae was conquered by the Khitan-led Liao dynasty in 926. A significant portion of Parhae's population fled to Goryeo while others remained in Parhae or were deported to other places in the Liao empire. Parhae survived as a distinct population group for another three centuries in the Liao and Jin dynasties before assimilating into other groups and disappearing under Mongol rule.

The history surrounding the origin of the state, its ethnic composition, the modern cultural affiliation of the ruling dynasty, the reading of their names, and its borders are the subject of a historiographical dispute between Korea, China and Russia. Historical sources from both China and Korea have described Parhae's founder, Tae Choyŏng, as related to the Mohe people and Goguryeo.

== Name ==
Parhae was founded in 698 by Tae Choyŏng (Da Zuorong) under the name 震 (진, Jin), read as tsyinH in Middle Chinese. The kingdom's name was transcribed as 振 in Chinese, with the same Middle Chinese reading as 震. This name is presumed to derive from the 'Jin' (震) trigram of the I Ching, which means thunder, movement, change, and corresponds with the East.

In 713, the Tang dynasty bestowed the ruler of Jin with the noble title "Prince of Commandery of Bohai (Parhae)" (渤海郡王). In 762, the Tang formally elevated Parhae to the status of a kingdom. The kingdom's territories did not overlap with the Bohai Commandery. According to the New Book of Tang, the state was referred to as Mohe (靺鞨, Kr. Malgal, name of the ethnic group) before receiving investiture from the Tang in 713 and assuming the name Bohai (Parhae). Historian Jin Yufu also argued that the Tang referred to the state as Mohe until that time and that "Parhae" may have been another transcription of the same name. Linguists Karl Heinrich Menges and Roy Andrew Miller raised another theory, suggesting that the name Parhae had an underlying native name which was cognate to Manchu butha ("hunting").

The transcriptions Bohai (Chinese pinyin romanization), Po-hai (Chinese Wade–Giles romanization), and Balhae (Revised Romanization of Korean) are also used in modern academia. Most Western-language scholarship have opted for Bohai except in the field of Korean studies; however, some scholars have chosen the Korean romanization to avoid a "Chinese" narrative spread by the usage of pinyin romanization. According to Pamela Kyle Crossley, neither Chinese or Korean transliterations can be correct. She chose to use modern Chinese transliteration "to indicate that the only referent we have is Chinese characters". Jonghyun Jee, Byungjun Kim, and Bong Gwan Jun concur with Crossley, noting that no historical accounts provide information on Parhae's pronunciation, and neither modern Chinese or Korean readings accurately represent the pronunciation at the time. The choice of transliteration for 渤海 as "Balhae" or "Bohai" therefore "inevitably entails a degree of modern political projection". Jesse D. Sloane chose to use "Parhae" because it was not covered in depth in the state-mandated curriculum of China, but used Chinese romanization for all other terms related to Parhae that appeared in Chinese sources first. Neither Crossley or Sloane meant to depict Parhae as essentially Chinese but used Chinese romanization out of convenience and to acknowledge the transnational origins of Parhae discourse.

According to the Shoku Nihongi, Japanese diplomatic communications with Parhae recognized it as a "state of Go[gu]ryeo." In a diplomatic mission to Japan in 727 or 728, the Parhae envoy said that Parhae has "recovered the lost land of Goguryeo and inherited the old traditions of Buyeo." Wooden tablets discovered in Nara Prefecture state that an envoy to Parhae in 758 was called a Goryeo envoy. Mun of Balhae referred to himself as "King of Goryeo" but Reisa Shimoda suggests that this was not to restore the old name, as noted in the Dai Nihonshi, but as a means of gaining Japan's favor by invoking Goryeo. Cho lee-ok suggests that Mun's claim to the title of "Heavenly Descendant" was inherited from Goguryeo. Examples of Parhae envoys being referred to as Goryeo envoys and Parhae kings as the king of Goryeo are found extensively in the Nara Period (710–794) but have not been found during the later Heian Period (794–1185).

== History ==
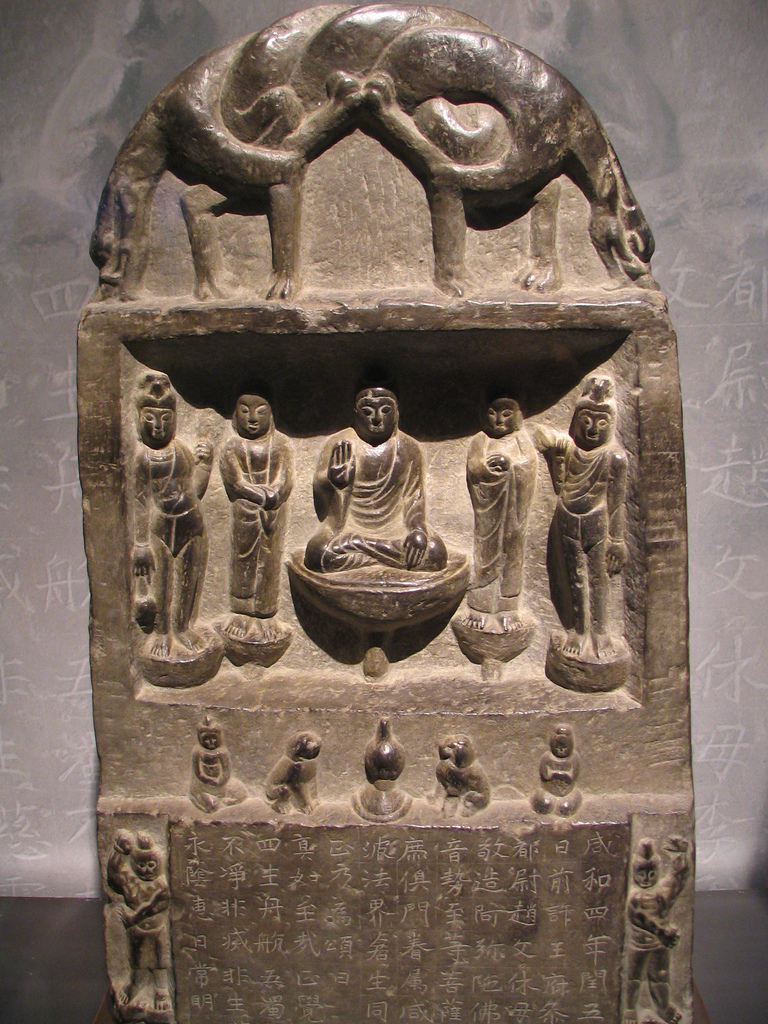
Buddhist relief sculpture from Parhae at the Ohara Museum of Art, Japan. The inscription in Literary Chinese contains a description of the artifact's making in 834 AD, and a poem honoring the dharma.

=== Origin ===
According to Old Book of Tang, after Goguryeo was defeated by the Tang, Tae Choyŏng (Da Zuorong) led his relatives to settle in Yingzhou (營州, modern-day Chaoyang) until they were disturbed by a Khitan rebellion in 696. The governor-general of Yingzhou, Zhao Wenhui, insulted the Khitan and Mohe chieftains by treating them like servants. Zhao refused to provide aid to their tribesmen when they suffered from famine. Li Jinzhong (Wushang Khan) of the Khitans along with his brother-in-law Sun Wanrong rebelled against Tang (Wu Zetian's Zhou Dynasty) hegemony, killed Zhao Wenhui, sacked Yingzhou, and attacked Hebei. Li died soon after and Sun succeeded him, only to be defeated by the Second Turkic Khaganate.

The population of Yingzhou fled eastward toward the Liao River during the turmoil. The Tang tried to appease Tae Chungsang (Da Zhongxiang), the father of Tae Choyŏng, and another leader named Kŏlsa Piu (Qisi Biyu), by granting them the titles of Duke of Zhen (Jin) and Duke of Xu (Heo) respectively. Kŏlsa Piu rejected the offer but was soon defeated by a Tang force led by Li Kaigu, while Tae Chungsang fled with his followers but also died around the same time. Tae Chungsang's son left the Liao River valley for Mt. Tianmen (in modern Jilin Province). The Old Book states that there, Tae Choyŏng united the Goguryeo and Mohe people to deal a heavy defeat upon the Tang forces led by Li Kaigu at the Battle of Tianmenling (Cheonmunnyeong). Because the route to Tae was cut off by the Kumo Xi and Khitans who had submitted to the Türks, Wu Zetian was unable to attack. Tae led his people east to the former area of Kyeru (Guilou) and built a walled settlement against Mount Dongmo (Dongmou) for protection. In 698, Tae Choyŏng declared himself King of Zhen (Jin).

The Old Book and New Book give different names for the leader that fled Yingzhou with Kŏlsa Piu. According to the Old Book, it was Choyŏng who fled with Kŏlsa Piu while the New Book states that it was Chungsang and his son succeeded him after his death. One theory to explain this discrepancy is that Choyŏng and Chungsang are actually the same person. Tae Chungsang's other name was Kŏlgŏl Chungsang and he may have taken Tae Choyŏng as a more Sinitic name after he became king of Parhae. According to this theory, the New Book confused the two names and assumed that Choyŏng was the son of Chungsang.

Other sources provide different accounts of Parhae's origin or differ in the details. According to Crossley, there was no rebellion at all, and the leader of the Sumo Mohe (Songmal Malgal) assisted the Tang by suppressing Khitan rebels. As a reward the Tang acknowledged the leader as the local hegemon of a semi-independent state. According to Wang Zhenping, Mohe people and Goguryeo loyalists were deported to Yingzhou after the fall of Goguryeo. They waited there for an opportunity to strike back. In 696, three Mohe chieftains took advantage of the Khitan rebellion to move further east. Kŏlsa Piu was defeated while Tae Chungsang died around the same time, leaving Chungsang's foster son, Tae Choyŏng, in control of the group. Choyŏng defeated a Tang punitive expedition and led his people to live in Dunhua.

In diplomatic communications between Silla and Jin, Silla attempted to confer investiture to Tae Choyŏng with the title of a fifth rank official: "Dae achan". Silla conferred this mid-ranking investiture partially out of a sense of superiority, but also because Parhae was a relatively new kingdom whereas Silla had been centuries old. The people of Jin did not know the system of ranks used in Silla and thus accepted the title. After a while, Tae Choyŏng realized the meaning of the title and sought to change Parhae's international status. In 713 or 714, the Tang dynasty recognized Tae Choyŏng as the "Prince of Bohai (Parhae)", the name for the sea surrounding Liaodong and Shandong.

According to Alexander Kim, neither the Tang or Silla recognized Parhae as the successor of Goguryeo. The Tang considered it a dukedom while Silla considered it their vassal. South Korean historians such as Kim Eng Gug, however, believe that the Tang viewed Parhae as Goguryeo's successor. Between 713 and 721, Silla constructed a northern wall to maintain active defences along the border. The Tang later recognized Parhae as a kingdom in 762 but Silla continued to view Parhae as a rebellious vassal. However, Kim Eun Gug argues that the "bestowal of a fifth-rank position was an expression of Silla's confidence, and such an exchange would have been unimaginable if Silla and Parhae were in a hostile relationship." After Tang recognition of Parhae as a kingdom, Parhae diplomatic missions to Japan began to refer to the Parhae ruler as descended from Heaven. Japanese officials criticized these letters, revised them, and limited diplomatic missions from Parhae. A royal epitaph and Buddhist scripture confirm this designation for the ruler of Parhae.

=== Ethnic identity ===
The ethnic identity of Parhae's founder is controversial and disputed. Many Chinese, Korean, Russian, and Japanese scholars of Parhae believe its population was composed of Goguryeo remnants and Mohe tribes. Chinese scholars consider the Mohe people to have formed the ethnic majority of Parhae, and arguments for this opinion are also viewed positively in Russia and in the West. Korean scholars and history texts generally hold that "the ruling class of Parhae were persons of Koguryŏ origins and that the people over whom they ruled were the Malgal, a people whose ethnic origins were different from Koguryŏ". While modern Korean scholars usually consider Parhae a Korean state and one of the Northern and Southern States of Korea, Russian and Chinese scholars reject this notion, echoing the position of historical Korean scholars such as Kim Pusik, author of the Samguk sagi.

Some historians view this dispute as the polemics reflecting modern politics rather than historical evidence.

The problem about Parhae history is that many questions are beyond a simple answer. Different, nearly contemporary, sources represent fundamental questions in very different ways with different possible interpretations.

— Johannes Reckel

Historical sources give different accounts of Tae Choyŏng's ethnicity and background. Among the official dynastic history works, the New Book of Tang refers to Tae Choyŏng and his state as Sumo Mohe (related to Jurchens and later Manchus) affiliated with Goguryeo. The Old Book of Tang also states Tae's ethnic background as Mohe but links him with Goguryeo via the term biezhong (gaoli biezhong ; 高麗別種). Literally speaking, biezhong means "separate kind." The term is interpreted as meaning "a branch of the Goguryeo people" by South and North Korean historians, but as "distinct from Goguryeo" by Japanese and Chinese researchers. The Old Book also states that the social customs of Parhae were the same as Goguryeo and the Khitans, and that after 699, the dispersed Goguryeo people joined the Turks and Mohe people.

According to Sloane, Tang sources divided Parhae's population into two categories, Goguryeo and Mohe. The royalty and upper class were composed of Goguryeo remnants while the majority of Parhae's population were Mohe. In a diplomatic mission to Japan in 727 or 728, the Parhae envoy said that Parhae has "recovered the lost land of Goguryeo and inherited the old traditions of Buyeo." Some consider this divide to be a cause of tension that contributed to Parhae's eventual downfall. Other scholars suggest that the Mohe people had been assimilated into Goguryeo culture to some extent, ranging from complete assimilation to at least applying to Parhae's founder. A minority of Korean scholars believe that the Mohe mentioned were not a distinct ethnic group but simply another term for Goguryeo's lower class, and that Parhae's population was composed entirely of Goguryeo descendants. Chinese scholars have made claims that Han Chinese were a part of the Parhae population, but apart from Goguryeo and Mohe, no other group is associated with the foundation of Parhae in Chinese, Korean, or Japanese sources.

According to Mark E. Byington, Chinese communications tended to refer to the state as either Parhae or Mohe with the exception of the Wujing Zongyao, which described Parhae as an offshoot of Buyeo. The Old Book referred to the Sumo Mohe as the Fuyu (Buyeo) Mohe in an entry dated to 690.

The question of the ethnic composition of the Bohai state has become a political problem in the East Asian region. Chinese and Korean historians alternatively regard Bohai as a Chinese provincial power or as an independent Korean country, based on intrinsically subjective positions. Certainly, all Korean specialists believe that the Koguryŏ population was dominant in Bohai. But Chinese historians tend to disagree, believing that Bohai was a Chinese province with some political autonomy, with the Mohe people as its main population.

— Alexander Kim and Min Kyounghyoun

According to Ch'oe Ch'iwŏn (b. 857), a scholar from Silla, the people of Parhae originated from the Sumo tribe of the Mohe people. In the conflict between the joint Tang-Silla forces against Parhae, Silla described Parhae as "rebellious barbarians." Silla's aristocracy tended to view the Parhae population as consisting solely of Mohe people, but this could be due to the antagonistic relations between the two states causing the Silla's nobility to ignore Goguryeo elements of Parhae ethnic composition.

As we know in relation to the origin of the Bohai people, when Gouli (Koguryŏ) was not yet destroyed, they [the Bohai people] were the useless tribe of Mohe. Many tribes were the same; its name was that of the small barbarian nation Sumo, and in the past [this tribe], being in competition with Gouli, moved to the inner region [China].

— Ch'oe Ch'iwŏn

The Ruijū Kokushi, a 9th-century Japanese text, says that when Parhae was founded, it spanned 2,000 li and was filled with villages, each of which were Mohe tribes. Japanese diplomatic communications with Parhae recognized it as a "state of Go[gu]ryeo" and that envoys to Parhae were Goryeo envoys.

In the early 12th century, the Jurchen leader Aguda sent ambassadors to the Liao dynasty to call on the Parhae people there to rebel against the Liao by appealing to a common origin between the Jurchens and Parhae. According to the appeal, both the Jurchens and Parhae people descended from the seven Wuji (Mulgil) tribes. However, according to Alexander Kim, this applied only to the Mohe portion of Parhae's population and not the Goguryeo people, who were not included in the seven Wuji tribes.

The Samguk sagi, written in the 12th century by Kim Pusik, did not consider Parhae a Korean state, but it contains an excerpt of a letter from the Tang Grand Preceptor describing remnants of Goguryeo forming a country which they named Parhae. The Samguk yusa, a 13th-century collection of Korean history and legends, describes Tae as a Sumo Mohe leader. However, it gives another account of Tae being a former Goguryeo general, citing a now-lost record from Silla. Alexander Kim considers this unlikely since Goguryeo fell in 668 while Tae died in 719, and young men could not receive the rank of general. The Tongmunson (Selections of Refined Literature of Korea), a 15th century compilation, contains an excerpt from a letter sent by Ch'oe Ch'iwŏn to a Tang official stating that "In the past, Emperor Gaozong of Tang destroyed Goguryeo, but that Goguryeo is now Balhae".

Russian scholars argue that the ethnic composition of Parhae cannot be determined with great precision because no material evidence exists that can confirm either the Chinese or Korean claims. Some Russian scholars claim Parhae as part of Manchurian history while others believe Parhae was neither a Korean state or a Chinese province and there is no direct link between Parhae and either modern China or Korea. E. V. Shavkunov believes that Parhae's population also consisted of elements from Central Asia such as Sogdians and Tocharians. After the defeat of the An Lushan rebellion in 763, the number of Sogdians in Parhae increased sharply. There were also Uyghurs in Parhae; Tae Muye (r. 719–737) bore the title of governor-general of the Nine Uyghur tribes and governor-general of Yanran, which covered northeast Mongolia. However, after the destruction of the Uyghur Khaganate in 840, many Uyghurs fled to Parhae but failed to adapt to Parhae society and caused social unrest. Moreover, Shavkunov suggests that the Mohe people did not consist of a single ethnic group. The Mongol Shiwei people for instance were regarded by medieval writers as part of the Mohe.

=== War with the Tang dynasty ===
Tae Choyŏng died in 719 and was succeeded by his son, Tae Muye (Da Wuyi, r. 719–737). While Muye accepted Tang gifts and title upon his succession, he showed his independence by giving his father a posthumous temple name, Kowang/Gaowang (high king). Muye adopted his own reign title in 720. In 721, the Tang asked Parhae for military support against the Khitans but they refused. To check Parhae's influence, the Tang appointed a chieftain of the Heishui Mohe (Heuksu Malgal) as prefect of Bozhou (in modern Khabarovsk) in 722. In 725, the Andong Protectorate suggested stationing an army in the region. In response, Tang officials dispatched an administration staffed by the leaders of smaller tribes under the command of the Youzhou governor-general. Muye was convinced that the Heishui Mohe and the Tang were plotting to attack him and that he needed a preemptive strike. He ordered his brother, Tae Munye (Da Wenyi), to attack the Heishui Mohe. Munye, who had stayed at the Tang capital as a hostage since the start of peaceful relations in 705, and understood the implications of attacking a Tang ally, was reluctant to carry out the order. He advised Muye to abandon the plan twice.

When Goguryeo was at its peak, the country had 300,000 elite soldiers. It resisted the Tang court and refused to submit itself to China. As soon as the Tang troops reached the country, however, Goguryeo was swept into the dust. Now the population of Balhae is several times less than that of Goguryeo. Yet you want to betray the Tang court. We must not do it.

— Tae Munye

Muye paid his brother no heed and used his reluctance as pretext to remove Munye from command. Munye fled to the Tang dynasty. A Parhae envoy arrived at the Tang court in 732 to request the execution of Munye. In response, the Tang secretly sent Munye to Central Asia while informing Muye that his brother had been banished to South China. The reality of events, however, leaked out, enraging Muye. A Parhae naval force led by Chang Munhyu (Zhang Wenxiu) attacked Dengzhou on the north shore of the Shandong Peninsula and killed its prefect. Dengzhou was the center of maritime trade routes in East Asia and the site where both Silla and Parhae envoys stayed when coming to pay tribute to the Tang Emperor. As a result, Parhae's attack on Dengzhou was not merely motivated by geopolitical retaliation against the Tang but also out a of a desire to assert its newfound maritime prowess as well as prevent the Heishui Mohe from establishing trade relations with the Tang, which would have weakened Parhae's dominace of the northern trade routes. Parhae's successful attack on Dengzhou also demonstrates a surprising maritime prowess for a thirty-year old state, which had military naval vessels that could cross the sea as well as merchant vessels that could carry out trade activities.

In response to the attacks, the Tang ordered Kim Chungsin, the nephew of Seongdeok of Silla and courtier in the Tang court, to return to Silla and organize an attack on Parhae. Chungsin excused himself from the request by asking to remain in China as the emperor's bodyguard. In his place, the Tang sent Kim Saran, a low ranking diplomat from Silla, and a Tang eunuch. Munye was also recalled to recruit soldiers in Youzhou. In the meantime, Parhae struck again, sacking the town of Mt. Matou (northwest of modern Shanhaiguan), and killing 10,000 Tang soldiers. The Parhae force raided and pillaged along the Liao River and the coast of the Liaodong Peninsula. In 733, Tang and Silla's forces attempted a joint attack on Parhae but were accosted by a blizzard that blocked all roads and killed half of the 100,000 Tang-Silla army, forcing them to abort the invasion. Muye continued to try to kill his brother. He sent an agent to Luoyang to plot the assassination of his brother. Munye was attacked in broad daylight near the Tianjin Bridge outside the imperial palace but escaped unharmed.

=== Reconciliation with the Tang ===
In 734, Silla attacked Parhae with no success. In an effort to curb Parhae's ambitions, the Tang granted Silla's request to place troops in the Paegang region in 735.

The strategic landscape began to turn on Parhae in 734–735, when the Khitan chieftain, Ketuyu, and his Turkic allies were defeated by Tang forces. In addition a force of 5,000 Kumo Xi cavalrymen surrendered to the Tang. The defeat of the Khitans and Turks, and the submission of the Kumo Xi removed the buffer zone that had formed between Parhae and the Tang. Sensing the change in strategic developments, Muye decided to reconcile with the Tang. In 737, Tang sailors and civilians detained in Parhae were repatriated. In 738, an envoy from Parhae requested Tang ritual codes and dynastic histories in a symbolic gesture towards peace. Muye died soon after.

=== Relations with Japan ===
Japanese records indicate that Parhae and Japan enjoyed very amicable relations. When King Mu sent Parhae's first envoy delegation to Japan in 727, the mission was made up of 24 men, which included high-ranking generals such as Ko Inŭi and Ko Chedŏk. King Mu had 300 sable furs sent by the Parhae delegation to Japan as both a show of goodwill and a desire to foster friendly relations with Japan.

Muye's son and successor, Tae Hŭmmu (Da Qinmao, r. 737–793), continued the course of reconciliation with the Tang. At the same time, trouble with the Tibetan Empire to the west forced the Tang to withdraw all military forces from Korea and adopt a defensive stance. Hŭmmu cemented the geopolitical balance by sending an envoy to the Japanese court, which his father had done as well in 728 to threaten Silla with an ally from the southeast. Parhae kept diplomatic and commercial contacts with Japan until the end of the kingdom. Parhae dispatched envoys to Japan 34 times, while Japan sent envoys to Parhae 13 times.

Parhae planned a joint attack on Silla with Japan. Gyeongdeok of Silla offended Japan twice. In 753 he treated Japanese ambassadors with arrogance and in 758 he refused to meet them. After 758, Japan asked Parhae to attack Silla with them. Parhae and Japan exchanged ambassadors several times in the 750s and 760s to plan for the attack. Silla likely knew of these plans and prepared by building six castles along the border with Parhae in 762. The border region changed hands many times but the losses are not described in Silla's official history, only the dates when an army was sent north. Japan prepared a fleet to invade southern Silla; however the plan never came to fruition.

In 755, the An Lushan Rebellion broke out, causing the Tang to lose control of the northeast, and even after the rebellion's end in 763, warlords known as jiedushi controlled the former northeastern part of the Tang empire. In 762, Emperor Daizong of Tang formally recognized Parhae as a state and Hŭmmu as its king. Although China recognized him as a king, Parhae itself referred to him as the son of heaven (emperor) and a king. The consort of the ruler was also called empress. In 771, Mun sent a letter to Japan declaring himself the "Grandson of Heaven". A record in 834 says that Parhae had both kings and great kings. The epitath of Princess Chŏnghyo (Zhenxiao), daughter of Hŭmmu, states that her father was a "great king."

=== Internal development ===
During Hŭmmu's reign, a trade route with Silla, called the "Sillado" (신라도; 新羅道), was established. The Silla trade route began at the Eastern Capital located at the center of Parhae's Yongwon Province, ran along the coast past what is now Hamgyong Province. This route, which also passed through Parhae's Southern Capital, was established for the purpose of conducting trade with Silla. Since the 1980s large numbers of archaeological sites related to Parhae have been excavated in North Korea; among those sites, the fortress at Bukcheong and the monastery site at Omae-ri in the city of Sinpo were locales engaged in the trade between Parhae and Silla. The route led from Pukchong, which was Parhae's Southern Capital, down along the coast to the Yonghung River; across the river was Silla's Chonjong Prefecture. Hŭmmu moved the capital of Parhae several times. He also established Shangjing/Sanggyeong, the permanent capital near Lake Jingpo in the south of modern day Heilongjiang province around 756, stabilizing and strengthening central rule over various ethnic tribes in his realm, which was expanded temporarily. He also authorized the creation of the Jujagam/Zhouzijian (주자감; 胄子監), the national academy, based on Guozijian, the national academy of Tang.

=== Conflict with Mohe tribes and Silla ===
The bilateral relationship between the Tang and Parhae grew friendlier. From 766 to 779, 25 missions from Parhae paid respect to Daizong. By the end of Hŭmmu's reign in 793, princes from Parhae's royal family were serving as guards at the court of Emperor Dezong of Tang of their own volition. Peace with the Tang allowed Parhae to further expand its territory. After the death of Hŭmmu, who was posthumously known as Mun (Wen, r. 737–793), Parhae experienced a succession crisis. As a result, Parhae lost territory and bordering Mohe tribes rebelled. Both the reigns of Sŏn (Xuan, r. 818–830) and Tae Ijin (Da Yizhen, r. 830–857) saw intrusions by Mohe tribes.

A fish tally discovered in Partizansky District, Primorsky Krai, shows that the Tang court was likely in contact with a Mohe tribe in this area acting independently in their foreign relations. The bronze fish tally, 6 cm long, is cut in half lengthwise. One half was kept at the imperial court while the commanding general in the territory kept the other half. When a messenger arrived with orders from the capital, their half of the tally was presented to the general for the purpose of authorization. The tally bears the inscription "General of the Left Xiaowei Guard Nie Liji", which is similar to the title Tae Choyŏng received from the Tang dynasty, "Great General of the Left Valiant Guard".

Sŏn annexed the Yuexi Mohe and other tribes along the Amur valley in the north. In 818-820, he also invaded Liaodong and parts of Silla on Parhae's southern border. In 826, Silla mobilized tens of thousands of people to fortify the border with Parhae. In the middle of the 9th century, Parhae completed its local administrative system, which was composed of five capitals, 15 prefectures and 62 counties. In 886, the Heishui Mohe put up wooden signs declaring that they wished to establish peaceful relations with Silla.

=== Liaodong ===
Since the 1980s, the view that Liaodong was part of Parhae's territory gradually became more prevalent. Underlying this theory is the idea that if Liaodong was not Tang territory, since it had been abandoned by the Tang, then it could only have been Parhae's territory. However according to Kim Jong-bok, despite the Tang abandonment of Liaodong, neither Silla or Parhae occupied the area. Silla did not advance beyond the Taedong River and in 827, Silla mobilized 10,000 people to build a defensive wall along the river due to attacks from Parhae. The Old Book of Tang mentions Parhae's territory bordering Silla to the south, the sea to the east, and the Khitan to the west, but not the Tang in the southwest. Kim Jong-bok notes that the Parhae capital (Shangjing Longquanfu) was located 800 km from the Goguryeo capital at Gungnae protected by the Hwando fortress, which was established prior to Goguryeo's western and southern conquest of Liaodong and Pyongyang. The Liaodong area was treated by the Parhae as a buffer zone, which can be seen by their passivity when the Khitans advanced into Liaodong twice in the early 10th century. By 915, the Khitan leader Abaoji was able to fish on the Yalu River and the only response from Silla and Goryeo was to send emissaries, which Abaoji did not respond to. Only after 918, when the Khitans took Liaoyang and resettled its people did Parhae respond with an attack in 924. The reason for the late response, according to Kim Jong-bok, was because Liaodong had become a buffer zone for the Tang and Parhae, which explains the relative peace between the Tang, Parhae, and Silla in contrast to the Goguryeo period.

=== War with the Khitans ===
In 907, Parhae came into conflict with the Khitan Liao dynasty because of the decision of the Khitans near modern Chifeng and Tongliao, who recognized the supremacy of Parhae, to become part of the Liao dynasty. The Liao ruler Abaoji took possession of the Liao River basin, which led to a long conflict. In 911, Silla allied with Parhae against the Khitans. In 924, Parhae attacked the Khitans. The next year, a Parhae general, Sindeok, surrendered to Goryeo. In 925, Silla allied with the Khitans and helped them in their war against Parhae. Afterwards, warriors from Silla were rewarded by the Khitan ruler. On 14 February 926, Abaoji's forces laid siege to Buyeo (Fuyu) province and captured it after three days. Six days later, the Khitan forces defeated the armies of Parhae and laid siege to the Parhae capital of Shangjing/Sanggyeong. After three days, the king of Parhae surrendered.

=== Demise ===
The Khitans spent several days securing their spoils and rooting out continued resistance. Abaoji secured the formal submission of the Parhae capital and most of the constituent regions. Within a month of Parhae's capitulation, Abaoji established the autonomous kingdom of Dongdan (Dan gur in Khitan), which means Eastern Dan Kingdom, ruled by the Liao crown prince Yelü Bei. Abaoji remained in the capital region for four months before making his way through Parhae's territory. However, when he reached Buyeo province, he became seriously ill and died a few days later on 6 September. Upon his death, the brother of the Parhae king attempted to recapture Buyeo province. A report to the Later Tang mentions that Parhae forces surrounded Buyeo although the uprising ultimately failed.

For a time the Parhae royal family continued to administer their former territory as Liao appointees in conjunction with Yelü aristocrats from Abaoji's Diela federation. Its independence ended in 929 when a new Liao ruler ordered the relocation of its population. It was soon absorbed into the Liao in 936. The name of Parhae was officially removed in 982. Meanwhile, a series of nobilities and elites led by key figures such as crown prince Tae Kwanghyŏn, were absorbed into Goryeo. Some Parhae aristocrats were forced to move to Liaoyang, the Liao Eastern Capital, but the eastern territory was recaptured by the Parhae nobles as Later Parhae, which was later renamed to Chŏngan (Ding'an). The Liao invaded Chŏngan in 975 but failed to conquer them. In 985–6, the Khitans attacked Chŏngan again, this time successfully. The last remnants of Parhae resistance from the former state of Chŏngan were destroyed by 999.

Some scholars considered the eruption of Mount Paektu in the 930–940s to have dealt a final blow to the surviving forces of Parhae based on records of massive population displacement of Parhae people to the Liaodong peninsula of the Khitan empire and the Korean peninsula of Goryeo. However this theory has lost popularity in Korea in recent times and Russian scholars do not consider it a plausible reason for Parhae's collapse. The most paramount reason seems to have been military confrontation with a superior power, the Khitans.

The Old Book of Tang stated that the kingdom originally had around 100,000 households and tens of thousands of soldiers, suggesting a population of around 500,000. At the time of its fall, its soldiers numbered "hundreds of thousands" according to the History of Liao. The kingdom's total population in its last years is variously estimated at between 1.5 and 4 million by historians today.

=== Later history ===
==== Goryeo ====
Though Parhae was lost, a great portion of the royalty and aristocracy fled to Goryeo, including Tae Kwanghyŏn, the last crown prince. They were granted land and the crown prince was given the family name Wang (왕; 王), the royal family name of the Goryeo dynasty, and included in the royal household by Wang Geon, who was crowned as Taejo of Goryeo. Koreans believe Goryeo thus unified the two successor nations of Goguryeo. Some other members of the Parhae royalty took the surname Tae (태; 太). According to the Goryeosa jeolyo, the Parhae refugees who accompanied the crown prince numbered in the tens of thousands of households. According to Alexander Kim, Goryeo's statistical information shows that more than 100,000 Parhae people moved to Goryeo at different points in time. As descendants of Goguryeo, the Parhae people and the Goryeo dynasts were related. Taejo of Goryeo felt a strong familial kinship with Parhae, calling it his "relative country" and "married country", and protected the Parhae refugees. This was in stark contrast to Later Silla, which had endured a hostile relationship with Parhae. Taejo displayed strong animosity toward the Khitans who had destroyed Parhae. The Liao dynasty sent 30 envoys with 50 camels as a gift in 942, but Taejo exiled the envoys to an island and starved the camels under a bridge, in what is known as the "Manbu Bridge Incident". Taejo proposed to Gaozu of Later Jin that they attack the Khitans in retribution for Parhae, according to the Zizhi Tongjian. Furthermore, in his Ten Injunctions to his descendants, he stated that the Khitans are "savage beasts" and should be guarded against. Khitan conquest of Parhae resulted in Goryeo's prolonged hostility towards the Khitan Empire.

Exodus en masse on part from the Parhae refugees would continue on at least until the early 12th century during the reign of King Yejong, according to Korean scholars. (Note: For example, 3,000 Parhae households came to Goryeo in 938.) Due to this constant massive influx of Parhae refugees, the Goguryeo population is speculated to have become dominant in proportion compared to their Silla and Baekje counterparts that had experienced devastating war and political strife since the advent of the Later Three Kingdoms. Later Baekje fared only little better than Later Silla before its fall in 936. Meanwhile, of the three capitals of Goryeo, two were Kaesong and Pyongyang which were initially populated by Goguryeoic settlers from the Paeseo Region (패서; 浿西) and Parhae.

Crossley believes that according to Goryeo records, Parhae refugees only arrived in groups of a few hundred to a few thousand. She suggests that the total number could not exceed 100,000, while millions remained in Liao-controlled territories. According to Crossley, it is also unclear whether they stayed, returned to Parhae, or moved on elsewhere, such as China or Japan. According to Kim, between the 10th and 11th centuries, 30,000 Parhae families (more than 100,000 people) immigrated to Goryeo, 94,000 local families (470,000 inhabitants) were deported by the Liao, and only 20,000 Parhae families lived in the former territories of Parhae, a significantly smaller figure than those that immigrated to Goryeo. Korean historians generally estimate that approximately 100,000 to 200,000 fled from Parhae to Goryeo. Historian Professor Park Jong-gi estimated that 120,600 people fled from Parhae to Goryeo, and by themselves comprised approximately 6.3% of early Goryeo's roughly 2 million inhabitants.

According to Kim, many Parhae refugees fled to Goryeo due to pro-Parhae policies during the mid 9th century. In the first few decades after Parhae's fall, Parhae refugees were welcomed by Goryeo. However, it seems few Parhae refugees retained high positions in Goryeo as service in the Khitan administration offered more benefits. Goryeo annals contain only six names of high-ranking officials who were of Parhae origin. From 1029 to 1030, the Khitan Administration was rocked by a rebellion by Parhae people after the government tried raising taxes on them. The leader of the rebellion was the Liao general Da Yanlin, a 7th generation descendant of the founder of Parhae. He arrested and killed Khitan leaders and proclaimed the establishment of a new dynasty, Xing Liao. He sent an ambassador to Goryeo requesting military support. Goryeo sent some military troops against the Liao but the Khitans repelled them and expelled the Goryeo army. Some of Goryeo's officers sought further confrontation with the Liao, but the Goryeo diplomatic corps and nobility asked the Goryeo king to exercise caution. The Goryeo king decided to abandon military activities against the Liao. Despite this, Parhae people continued to send missions to Goryeo requesting assistance. The last mission, led by Lee Kwang Rok, arrived after the destruction of the state, and Kim considers this group as refugees, not members of an ambassadorial mission. Kim believes that in the 11th century, Parhae people under the Liao started viewing Goryeo as a hostile state in which the Parhae people lacked support.

==== Liao dynasty ====
The Parhae people played a pivotal role in the politics, literature, and society of northern China under the Liao and Jin dynasties. After the dissolution of Parhae by the Khitan empire, the term "Bohai" was used through the fourteenth century to denote a subset of the populations of the Liao, Jin, and Mongol empires. The Liao Eastern Capital (Dongjing, modern-day Liaoyang, Liaoning) served as a base for monitoring the former Parhae territories. The city's residents, over 40,000 in the early tenth century, were primarily Parhae, according to a figure cited by Pamela Crossley. According to Wittfogel and Feng, an undated Liao census puts the number of Parhae households in the Eastern Capital at around 100,000, which would be around half a million individuals. The total population of the Liao dynasty at its peak as given by Wittfogel and Feng lists the Khitans at 750,000, Parhae at 650,000, Han Chinese at nearly 3 million, and other ethnic groups around 200,000. Crossley provides a higher estimate of the total Parhae population at between 1.5 and 4 million people.

Tae Insŏn (Da Yinzhuan), the last king of Parhae, and other members of the former royal lineage still held considerable authority in the semi-autonomous kingdom of Dongdan and the Eastern Capital after Parhae's fall. Some Parhae elites were integrated into the Liao aristocracy and the Liao imperial bodyguard, and often changed their personal identities dramatically. However Crossley argues that the Liao did not have a deliberate policy of dissolving the Parhae aristocracy and instead encouraged them to stay in Dongdan to handle its governance. Rather, they were more interested in dispersing the Parhae commoners as part of a larger trend of resource distribution to appease the constituents of the powerful Diela federation. This is supported by the resettlement of Parhae people even prior to the fall of Parhae in 926. In essence, the Liao ruling class was primarily interested in resource extraction and redistributing Parhae commoners as labor to their followers (the Diela sub-federations). The Parhae royal family was left in charge of the Dongdan Kingdom's administration so long as they did not impede their extractive enterprise.

After 926, a portion of the Parhae population was resettled in other parts of the empire, mainly around the Eastern Capital but also to places as far as the western side of the empire on the banks of the Orkhon River. Parhae people were also resettled in the Supreme Capital (Chifeng, Inner Mongolia). These resettled Parhae groups ranged in size from a few hundred to as many as 5,000 households, accounting for possibly 100,000 to 200,000 resettled individuals by the 950s. The History of Liao states that Parhae garrisons could be found all over the empire mixed with a smaller number of Han soldiers.

Sites associated with Parhae resettlement do not display particularly strong distinctiveness in their material culture, although this may be due to greater supervision by their superiors. Among the Parhae who were not resettled, cultural distinctiveness is much clearer and several sites in Primorsky Krai display cultural patterns that continued to influence the region for centuries. Archaeological findings at Anuchinsky District, Primorsky Krai, show that remnants of the Parhae population tried to build a palace in imitation of the defunct Parhae state some time after its fall. The architectural endeavor was a failure, possibly owing to a lack of experience and expertise. Alexander Kim suggests that this may have been an attempt by a local ruler to establish a regional empire.

With the abolishment of the Dongdan Kingdom in 929 and the departure of its ruler, Yelü Bei, in 930, Parhae's territory started a process of integration into the Liao dynasty. After Yelü Bei left, Diela federation members and representatives moved into Dongdan along with loyal members of the Parhae royal family. A large part of Parhae's administrative structure was dismantled and the Liao sent Han and Khitan settlers, most of whom were soldiers, to colonize former Parhae territory. However, the region was treated as a tributary state for tax purposes. An annual payment of 1,000 horses and 150,000 bolts of cloth was levied on the region, but monopoly taxes on salt and wine did not exist, and there were only minimal taxes on commerce. In the 1020s, the Southern Establishment which administered the settled areas of the Liao dynasty tried to extend its taxation system to the Parhae people of the defunct Dongdan kingdom who previously only had to pay the reduced tribute payment. The Parhae people were ordered to build boats to transport grain to the Southern Capital. The journey was dangerous and many boats were lost, leading to resentment.

In the summer of 1029, a distant descendant of Parhae royalty, Da Yanlin, rebelled at the Eastern Capital. He imprisoned minister Xiao Xiaoxian and his wife, killed the tax commissioners and chief military commander, and declared his own Xing Liao dynasty (興遼國/흥료국). He requested aid from Goryeo, who sent forces against Liao only to be repelled. Further ambassadors were sent by Xing Liao to Goryeo seeking aid but Goryeo refused to help them owing to the advice of nobles and scholars to the Goryeo king. Four groups of ambassadors were sent but the last group remained in Goryeo rather than return. Other Parhae people serving in the Liao military also refused to join Xing Liao. Instead only a handful of Jurchens joined his regime. Many participants of the rebellion probably realized the weakness of the new dynasty and fled to Goryeo before its collapse. A year later, one of Da Yanlin's officers betrayed him and opened the Eastern Capital's gates to the Khitans. His short lived dynasty came to an end. The old Parhae nobility were resettled near the Supreme Capital while others fled to Goryeo.

In 1114, Parhae descendants took advantage of the Jurchen-Khitan war and rebelled under the leadership of Gu Yu, who commanded 30,000 soldiers. They defeated Khitan armies twice before they were destroyed.

In 1116 another rebellion occurred at the Eastern Capital when the Khitan Regent Xiao Baoxian alienated the population due to his harsh administration. A band of some 10-odd Parhae entered the Regent's compound and stabbed him to death. The Commissioner of Revenue Da Gongding (1043-1121) and Vice-Regent Gao Qingchen, themselves Parhae descendants, gathered a force of Han and Kumo Xi troops and killed this group of Parhae. According to the History of Jin and Song sources, the Han and Kumo Xi population in the Eastern Capital started massacring the Parhae people. When news reached the Parhae in Liaodong, they began pillaging, causing the Han and Kumo Xi people to flee the region. An officer named Gao Yongchang emerged as the leader of the Parhae rebellion and declared himself emperor of the "Great Bohai" and the "Great Origin" (Da Yuan; same name as the Mongol-led Yuan dynasty). He sent envoys to the Jin requesting an alliance but the Jurchens replied with skepticism, pointing out that he only held the Eastern Capital. The Jin relief troops sent to the Yuan easily repulsed the Liao forces but then turned on the Parhae rebels. A captured Parhae betrayed Gao Yongchang, who was subsequently killed. Song sources portray the rebellion as an ethnic conflict between the Parhae and other groups. Gao Yongchang tried to recruit the Hesuguan Jurchens living under Liao domination but failed to attract the following of any ethnicity other than the Parhae.

The distinction between Parhae and Jurchen rebellions was not always clear to the Liao. In the 1117 epitaph of an officer who died while fighting against Jurchens in 1114, the Parhae and Jurchens were mentioned in connection to each other and placed within a similar category.

==== Jin dynasty ====
The Khitans themselves eventually succumbed to the Jurchen people, the descendants of the Mohe, who founded the Jin dynasty. Jurchen proclamations emphasized the common descent of the Parhae and Jurchens from the seven Wuji (勿吉) tribes. The Jin sent two Parhae representatives to recruit "people from their home area" while bearing a message that "The Jurchen and Bohai are originally of the same family; as we rise in arms to smite the wicked, [harm] will not unjustly reach the innocent." The fourth, fifth and seventh emperors of Jin were mothered by Parhae consorts. Nevertheless, the 13th century census of Northern China by the Mongols distinguished Parhae people who belonged to the Khitan Empire from other ethnic groups such as Goryeo, Khitans and Jurchens.

A Song observer notes that during the Liao era, Parhae people were not employed in the government, as a result they were the first to defect to the Jin. The call for Parhae defectors was met with significant success. Aguda was advised by a Parhae man named Yang Pu who aided him in establishing an imperial court. Another Parhae man named Gao Qinyi became the advisor of Wanyan Zonghan, a Jurchen general and close friend of Aguda. An 1125 embassy noted that Jin protocol officers included Khitans, Jurchens, as well as Parhae. They all spoke Chinese. A descendant of the Parhae royal family, Da Gao (1086–1153), served in the Jin army and was given command of eight Parhae battalions in the war against the Song dynasty. One Parhae commander, Guo Yaoshi (active 1116–1132) fought in the Liao, Jin, and Song armies at one point or another. The Parhae played a critical role in supporting Emperor Shizong of Jin's accession to the throne.

I am of the Parhae Da, once a family of note. When the Jin first recruited me, they [promised to] let me found a state in Liaodong. Since then I have worn armor and borne weapons, following the army and contesting in battle as the years accumulated. I have failed to gain even one commandery as a safe haven.

— Da Gao (personal name Dabuye)

Families of Parhae descent were able to rise high in the Jin hierarchy, including Zhang Rulin (d. 1190) and Zhang Rubi (d. 1187), who were key advisers of Emperor Shizong, and Li Yin (jinshi 1194, d. 1214), who died fighting against the Mongols. Parhae descendants also participated with success in the Jin imperial examinations. Many Parhae literati-officials such as Gao Kan (d. 1167), Gao Xian (jinshi 1203), Zhang Rulin, Zhang Runeng, Zhang Ruwei (fl. 1150), Zhang Rufang, and Wang Tingyun (1151–1202) were entrusted as arbiters of culture and cultivated taste. Wang Tingyun's family received literary distinctions. His eldest daughter became a Daoist priestess, named Congqing, and was a poet at the imperial court. Intermarriage between Parhae civil elites in the Jin dynasty was common. In 1190, Wang Ji identified two families he encountered in Liaodong as Parhae. Writing after the fall of the Jin dynasty in 1234, Liu Qi identified the military commander Li Ying as a "Bohai man of Liaodong."

There were still limitations on Parhae people in the Jin dynasty. In 1136, the Jurchen official Wanyan Puluhu revoked the pardon of a man when his origin was determined to be Parhae. Policies to restrain and weaken Parhae were increased over time. In 1140, an edict abolished Han Chinese and Parhae hereditary military garrisons but not Kumo Xi and Khitan garrisons. The Jin government also targeted the Parhae population for relocation. Over the years, groups of Parhae who were once moved outside to areas near the Liao supreme or central capital regions were resettled east of the Taihang Mountains, which was completed by 1141. Another relocation south of Zhongdu was planned in 1149, but the Parhae court attendant Gao Shouxing protested to Empress Daoping, who told the emperor, resulting in the beating and death of the two officials planning the relocation. A substantial Jin military presence was bought to Liaodong in which as many as thirty Jurchen meng'an units (meng'an literally means one thousand or units composed of one thousand soldiers) and the families of the retinues were moved to garrisons in the Eastern Capital Circuit. The southward migration of Jurchens, especially Jurchen aristocrats, may have contributed to a decline of people who identified as Parhae. In 1177, a decree was passed to abolish the "old Bohai custom" of marriage through mock abduction. Although the Parhae experienced less restrictions under the Jin, there was also less emphasis on Parhae as a distinct group. During the later Jin era, the strong association between Parhae and Liaodong declined as Liaodong became dominated by other identities.

As Parhae descendants became firmly incorporated into the apparatus of the Jurchen-led state, many individual Parhae-descended officials willingly chose to self-identify as Chinese. In 1135, Nansali was chosen as an emissary to Goryeo, for which he changed his name to the Sinitic Wang Zheng. Wang Tingyun also invented a genealogy record on his epitaph tracing his lineage to Taiyuan rather than Liaodong. The epitaph acknowledges that his most recent ancestors were in the employ of Parhae but added that they only "lived dispersed among the eastern barbarians", rejecting his Parhae identity. The practice of inventing fictitious genealogies to hide ancestry outside of the "Central Territories" was widespread from Song times onward.

==== Mongol Empire ====
The term "Parhae" became noticeably less prevalent under the rule of the Mongol Empire. There is no trace of Parhae descendants from the defunct Jin dynasty and no epitaphs from the Mongol era claim a Parhae identity. Parhae was only used as a toponym in the early 14th century and Parhae disappeared entirely from historical sources by the late 14th century. Near the end of Mongol rule, the scholar Tao Zongyi put Parhae alongside Khitan and Jurchen under a subcategory within Hanren, which is not surprising given that most of them at the time of the Mongol conquest were literati, officials, or attachments to the Jin bureaucracy. Many chose to use Chinese style names, similar to Jurchens, probably for inclusion in the Hanren (Northern Chinese) category under the Mongol hierarchy, rather than the inferior fourth category, Nanren (Southern Chinese). Aside from legal references to the Taihe Code of the Jin dynasty, the term "Parhae" is absent from the Yuan legal compendium. The referenced passages have to do with limitations on levirate marriage for Han and Parhae and restrictions on marriage during mourning.

Some Parhae adopted Mongol or Tatar culture rather than Chinese. The biography of You Xingge (d. 1227) identifies him as Parhae. As the Jin dynasty was collapsing from the Mongol invasions, You established an independent fort near Gaozhou (modern Chifeng). They fought off several military detachments until they were besieged by Muqali. After You surrendered, Muqali praised him to Genghis Khan, who bestowed on him the Mongol name Halabadu. He later fought for the Mongols at Taiyuan in 1227. You Xingge's son is only referred to by the name Mangqutai, which denotes him as part of the Mangqutai tribe.

The decline of Parhae identity was not a gradual and steady process. According to Toyama Gunji, "the Bohai remained alive and well for three hundred years of history" after the state was destroyed.

== Culture ==
Parhae's population was composed of former Goguryeo people and Tungusic Mohe people in Manchuria. Within sixty sites identified as Parhae settlements, many had dwellings with heating stoves, ceramic roof tiles, and vessels. Iron agricultural implements suggest that sophisticated agriculture was practiced in parts of Parhae. These finds indicate that much of the population even outside the capitals were sedentary.

According to Yang Jun, Parhae had a diverse ethnic makeup including minorities such as Khitan and Evenk peoples. Michael J. Seth also argues that Parhae was multi-cultural, and believes archaeological evidence suggests that the Parhae culture was an amalgamation of High Tang Chinese, Korean, and Tungusic cultures. Archaeological findings demonstrate that Parhae culture contained elements from Mohe, Goguryeo, Turkic, as well as Tang Chinese cultures. However, scholars from Japan, China, Russia and Korea emphasize some components over the others because of their national backgrounds.

Han Ciu-cheol believes that many of Goguryeo's tradition were continued by Parhae, such as the use of Ondol heating systems in Parhae's royal palaces as well as the use of stone lined tombs, stone chambers and stone coffins used by Goguryeo's ruling class. According to Japanese historian Shiratori Kurakichi, 26 of the 85 emissaries dispatched to Japan by Parhae bore the typical Goguryeo surname of Ko (Go), which is still commonly used in Korea, indicating a substantial Goguryeo presence in Parhae culture.

Features of tombs in the capitals and in the broader Parhae landscape have been ascribed to Mohe or Tang cultural influences. According to Wei Cuncheng, early Parhae tombs outside the capitals were earthen pits, which Chinese and Japanese scholars have interpreted as a sign of Mohe culture. On the other hand, Yun Jae-Woon argues that the earthen pit tombs were simply the dominant style among Parhae commoners. In early Japanese excavations of the Parhae capital's tombs and in later Chinese scholarship, the practices of joint burial for family members and reburial were identified as similar to the Sumo Mohe. Late in Parhae history, single-chambered brick tombs appeared. Chinese scholars see both the brick tombs and their depiction of Parhae elites in paintings as signs of Tang influence.

Sloane and Dieter Kuhn caution against assigning ethnicity to Parhae using architectural features as proof. Kuhn states that architectural types are not a reliable indicator of identity and points out that the Khitan Liao dynasty's architecture is completely based on Tang and Parhae precedents, with no distinctive "Khitan" elements. Architectural styles can be limited based on the environment, techniques and materials available. Certain structures such as pit dwellings could have been preferred in Parhae as a practical solution to low temperatures and to protect against the wind, rather than because of the occupants' ethnicity. Some Russian scholars believe that no materials exist that can confirm Parhae's exact ethnic makeup.

A record of the journey of Hong Hao (1088–1155) in Jin territory describes the Parhae people as primarily martial and not adherent to Confucian norms. Parhae women were described as "fiercely jealous" and prevented the men from deviating from martial fidelity. Parhae men were described as "full of cunning, surpassing other nations in courage, such that there exists a saying 'Three Bohai are a match for a tiger.'" Parhae soldiers had a reputation for fierceness and a large number of them were recruited into the Liao dynasty's imperial bodyguard. Some Parhae people practiced Buddhism. However Parhae cultural markers evidently did not deviate to the point of preventing assimilation into neighboring societies. There was widespread use of "Chinese" style surnames in Parhae and no distinct cultural marker prevented civil elites of Parhae ancestry from integrating into Chinese literati society in their later history. There is no evidence of any friction in this process. Other cultural markers such as martial traditions may have also facilitated the adoption of Mongol, Tatar, and Jurchen backgrounds.

== Society ==
According to Korean scholars and other historians, Mohe made up the working class which served the Goguryeo ruling class. Some historians believe that ethnic conflicts between the ruling Goguryeos and underclass Mohe weakened the state. Other historians offer dissenting views. Han Ciu-cheol agreed that Mohe people were the majority of Parhae's population but disagreed that they were any different from Goguryeo or Parhae. According to Han, the origins of "Malgal" and "Mulgil" lie in the Goguryeo language, and "the Malgal language and customs were the same as those of Goguryeo and Balhae."

On the other hand, the Russian historian Polutov believes that Goguryeo descendants did not have political dominance, and the ruling system was open to all people equally. Its ruling structure was based on the military leader-priestly management structure of the Mohe tribes and also partly adapted elements from the Chinese system. After the 8th century, Parhae became more centralized, and power was consolidated around the king and the royal family.

The class system of Parhae society is controversial. Some studies suggest there was a stratified and rigid class system similar to those of the related Korean kingdoms and pre-Qin northern China. Elites tended to belong to large extended aristocratic family lines designated by surnames. The commoners in comparison had no surnames at all, and upward social mobility was virtually impossible as class and status were codified into a caste system. Other studies have shown there was a clan system but no clear division of classes existed, whereas the position of the clan leader depended on the strength of the clan. Any member of the clan could become the clan leader if he had sufficient authority. There were also religiously privileged shaman clans. The clan struggles were also partly due to growing Tang influence and different attitudes toward further Sinicization. The main part of society in Parhae was free in a personal capacity and consisted of clans.

By the time of the state's demise, the Parhae mode of living had come to resemble that of the northern Chinese. The Liao dynasty classified the Parhae population as Han in legal and taxation contexts, the same as those whose ancestry was traced to the Tang empire. Some Mohe groups did not adopt this manner of life and were excluded from the Liao's designation of Parhae. Instead, they remained as Mohe, and would become an important source of the Jurchen people in the future.

== Government ==
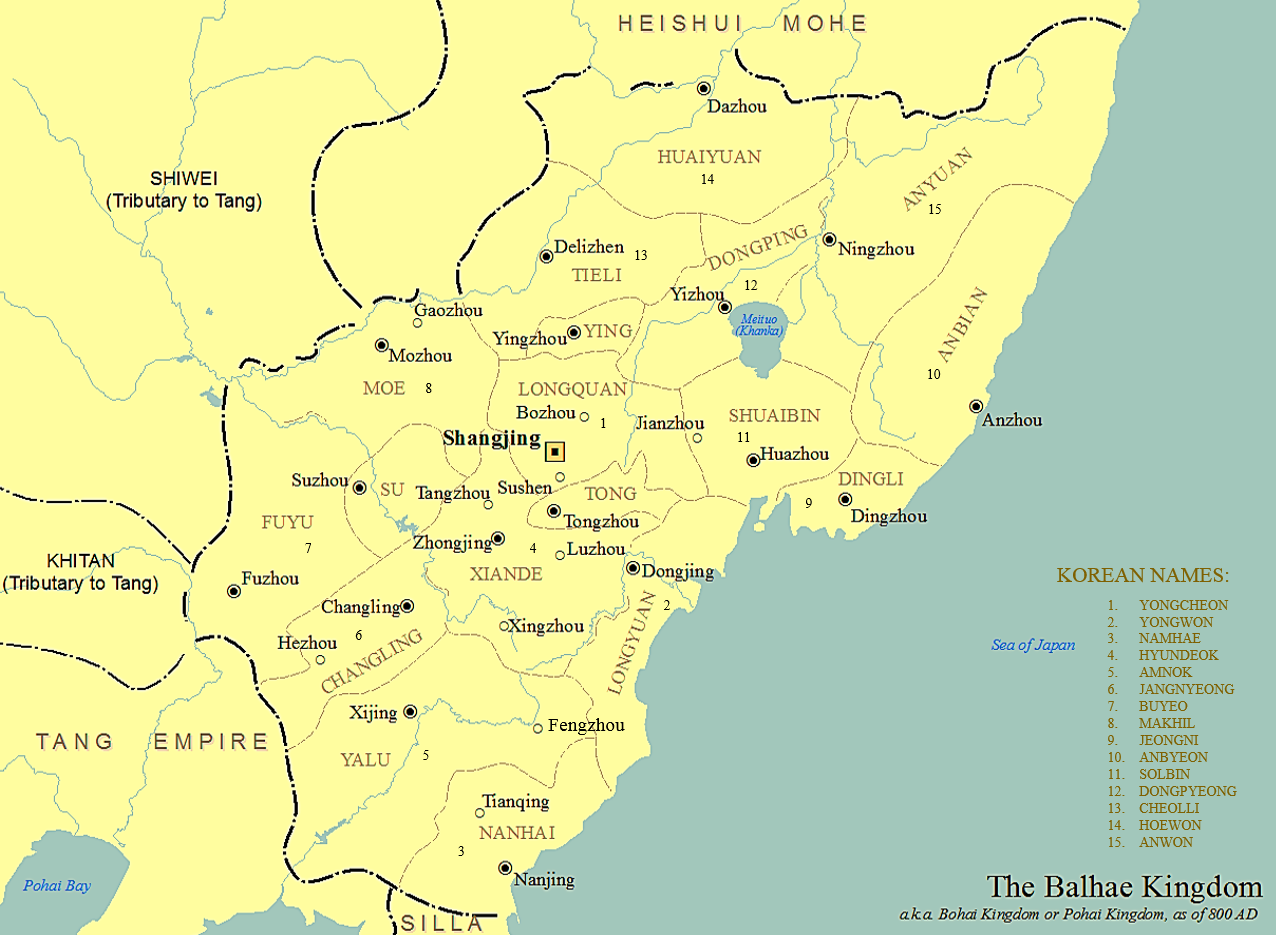
Administrative divisions of the Parhae kingdom, with Chinese and Korean names (Note: Map of Parhae)

Parhae adopted Chinese institutions to organize its central political system. The Three Departments and Six Ministries system, which was fully developed during the Tang dynasty, later became the standard model for government organization in many East Asian states, and Parhae also incorporated it. Parhae divided its administrative regions into 15 provinces (bu), which were further subdivided into 62 prefectures (ju). During the reign of King Mun of Parhae, the state adopted and modified the Tang dynasty’s Three Departments and Six Ministries system. While the administrative structure was reorganized based on the Tang model, both the names and operational functions were adapted to local conditions. The Six Ministries were renamed using Confucian virtues—Chung (loyalty), In (benevolence), Ui (righteousness), Ye (propriety), Ji (wisdom), and Sin (trustworthiness)—in place of the original designations. In addition, the offices of Left and Right Chief Ministers (Jwasajeong and Usajeong) were established to further divide and balance ministerial authority. To promote Confucian learning and cultivate administrative talent, Parhae established the Jujagam, modeled after the Tang dynasty’s Guozijian, as a central institution for classical Confucian education and bureaucratic training.

King
Jungjeongdae (중정대, 中正臺)	Munjeogwon (문적원, 文籍院)	Jujagam (주자감, 冑子監)
Seonjo-seong (선조성, 宣詔省)	Jeongdang-seong (정당성, 政堂省)	Jungdae-seong (중대성, 中臺省)
Jwasajeong (좌사정, 左司政)	Usajeong (우사정, 右司政)
Chung-bu (충부, 忠部)	In-bu (인부, 仁部)	Ui-bu (의부, 義部)	Ji-bu (지부, 智部)	Ye-bu (예부, 禮部)	Sin-bu (신부, 信部)

Parhae's aristocrats and nobility traveled to the Tang capital of Chang'an on a regular basis as ambassadors and students, many of whom went on to pass the imperial examinations. Three students are recorded in 833 and a royal nephew in 924.

Although Parhae was a tributary state of the Tang dynasty, it followed its own independent path, not only in its internal policies, but also in its foreign relations. Furthermore, it regarded itself as an empire, and sent ambassadors to neighbor states such as Japan in an independent capacity. A record on a Buddhist statue from 834 confirms that Parhae viewed its rulers as consisting of kings and great kings. Epitaphs of Parhae royal members such as a princess and the wife of a Parhae ruler state that the ruler was a "great king" or an emperor.

Parhae ruled its vast territory through a system of five capitals (gyeong), fifteen provinces (bu), and sixty-two prefectures (ju), appointing dodeok to the prefectures and jasa to the counties, while local leaders governed the smaller villages. Parhae's original capital was at Dongmo Mountain in modern Dunhua, Jilin Province, China. In 742 it was moved to the Central Capital in Helong, Jilin. It was moved to the Upper Capital in Ning'an, Heilongjiang in 755, to the Eastern Capital in Hunchun, Jilin in 785, and back to the Upper Capital in 794. Sanggyong (Upper Capital) was organized in the way of the Tang capital of Chang'an. Residential sectors were laid out on either side of the palace surrounded by a rectangular wall. The same layout was also implemented by other East Asian capitals of the time.

== Military ==
Parhae's military organization consisted of a central army divided into ten guard units (wi, 衛) responsible for protecting the royal palace and the capital. Local militias were organized in the 15 local provinces (bu) for other regions according to the regional administrative structures, with local officials commanding them. Independent troops were stationed at key border points for defense.

The development of Parhae's military system can be broadly divided into three phases. The first phase involved establishing administrative systems for the newly expanded territories during the early stages of the kingdom's founding. The second phase saw the establishment of the ten guards as recorded in the Xin Tangshu (New Book of Tang). In contrast, the third phase occurred after the envoy Wang Zhongwu reported on Parhae's military situation following his visit.

Parhae expanded its territory by conquering the Mohe (Malgal) tribes in Manchuria, Primorsky Krai, the Amur River region, and along the coast of the Sea of Japan, during which many fortresses were built. Some of these include the Palryeonseong, Mariyanovka Fortress, Cheonghaeto Fortress, Koksharovka Fortress Site, Kraskino Fortress Site, Nikolayevka Fortress Site in Partizansk, Suchanluha Fortress Site, Bittik Mountain Fortress Site, Ryuzanka Fortress Site, Usti-Chornaya Fortress Site, Namusurisk Fortress Site, Korsakovka Fortress Site, and Novgorodeyev Fortress Site.

=== First phase ===
The first phase was a period during which the overall system was established, and this period firmly retained the legacy of Goguryeo, with military and administrative functions often overlapping. Volume 193 of Ruijū Kokushi records that "Parhae spans 2,000 li in all directions, and no prefectures or counties exist. Villages are scattered throughout, mostly Malgal settlements. The people are mostly Malgal, and few are native. All the natives are made village chiefs, with large villages appointing a Dudu/Dudok (都督, Governor) and smaller ones appointing a Cishi/Jasa (刺史, Prefect), while the rest of the leaders are called Shouling/Suryong (首領, Chiefs)." The Dudok or Jasa were likely regional administrative officials of Parhae, such as the Yakheolju Dudok, Mokjeoju Jasa, and Hyeontoju Jasa. Since this was an early period when the system was still being established, remnants of the former Goguryeo dynasty's institutions were still present in many areas, and the division of the entire country was still incomplete. Therefore, in military terms, troops were dispatched mainly to tense situations.

Through the continued territorial expansion during the reigns of King Go and King Mu, Parhae's territorial boundaries were secured, and the government structure was reorganized and completed by acquiring territory, population, and tax revenues. Considering that the initial military force at the time of Parhae's founding was only a few thousand, Parhae likely needed to make overall adjustments to the expanded territory and population. Parhae, which had borders with powerful neighboring states like the Tang Dynasty, the Turks, the Khitans, the Heishui Mohe, and Silla, faced deteriorated relations with its neighbors due to its early aggressive conquests. Moreover, having witnessed the fall of Goguryeo, the dominant power in the previous era, Parhae needed to strengthen and reorganize its military. Therefore, this period can be seen as when Parhae laid the foundation for establishing a new system based on Goguryeo's legacy over the expanded territory.

=== Second phase ===
The second phase saw the establishment of central departments and the ten guards, as recorded in the New Book of Tang. The Zhengtangsheng/Jeongdangseong (政堂省), one of the three central departments, managed the military, recruitment, maps, war chariots, and weapons through the subordinate department known as the Zhibu/Jibu (智部). Subordinate to the Jibu were practical departments such as the Rongbu/Yongbu (戎部) and Shuibu/Subu (水部). For example, Yang Seung-gyeong, who was sent as an envoy to Japan in 758, held the central position of Boguk Daejanggun and Janggun (輔國大將軍兼將軍) and the regional position of Mokjeoju Jasa (木底州刺史), and he was also involved in managing national defense. However, the origins of these titles are difficult to trace, as they do not appear in the central official system. This indicates that Parhae organized its military by establishing the Jibu as the central department responsible for military affairs and its subordinate departments like the Yongbu or the Byeongseo (兵書).

Parhae had ten guards, including the "Left and Right Mengbenwei/Mangbunwi (猛賁衛), Left and Right Xiongwei/Ungwi (熊衛), Left and Right Piwei/Biwi (羆衛), Left and Right Nanwei/Namwi (南衛), and Left and Right Beiwei/Bukwi (北衛)." Each guard had a Da Jiangjun/Daejanggun (大將軍) and a Jiangjun/Janggun (將軍). This system was likely modeled after the Tang Dynasty's 16 or 12 guards. Each guard had one Daejanggun and one Janggun, equivalent to the Tang Dynasty's Shang Jiangjun (上將軍) and Jiangjun (將軍). The ten guards protected the royal family and oversaw the local militia. In 1960, a seal inscribed with "Tianmenjun/Cheonmungun's Seal" (天門軍之印), belonging to one of Parhae's military units, was discovered southwest of the royal city of Sanggyeong Yongcheonbu. The discovery of this seal suggests that the army under each guard was responsible for guarding the gates of the royal city.

Meanwhile, the Shoku Nihongi records that in 728, among the envoys sent to Japan, there were officials such as You Jiangjun/Yujanggun (游將軍) and Guoyi Duwei/Gwaidowi (果毅都尉) Dezhou/Deokju (徳周). The title Guoyi Duwei was adopted from the Tang Dynasty's military system. In the Tang Dynasty, the Weibu (衛部) and the Zhechongfu (折衝府) were part of the military system. The Zhechongfu was further divided into upper, middle, and lower levels, with each level having one Zhechong Duwei (折衝都尉) and two Guoyi Duwei (果毅都尉). The Guoyi Duwei of the upper level was equivalent to the 5th rank, the middle level to the 6th rank, and the lower level to the 6th rank. In Parhae, the existence of the Guoyi Duwei/Gwaidowi indicates that Parhae likely adopted the Tang Dynasty's military system and established local militias in the provinces.

In particular, the military titles of envoys sent to Japan during the early period of Parhae, such as Janggun (將軍) or Boguk Daejanggun (輔國大將軍), suggest that the military system was already being organized at that time. The Jasa was a local administrative official overseeing the province, and the Daejanggun and Janggun were the highest military positions. The presence of various military titles among these envoys indicates that the system was already in the process of being organized.

=== Third phase ===
The third phase occurred after the envoy Wang Zhongwu reported on Parhae's military situation following his visit. In 832, after returning from Parhae, Wang Zhongwu reported to Emperor Wenzong of Tang that "Parhae has Left and Right Shencejun/Shinchaekgun (神策軍), Left and Right Sanjun/Samgun (三軍), and 120 departments." This indicates that the military system had evolved from the early generals' system to the Left and Right ten guards, and by the time Wang Zhongwu returned from his mission, it had already been expanded and reorganized into the Left and Right Shinchaekgun, Left and Right Samgun, and 120 departments. The Sanjun in the Tang Dynasty referred to the Left Longwu (龍武), Left Shenwu (神武), and Left Yulin (羽林) armies, while the Right Sanjun referred to the Right Longwu, Right Shenwu, and Right Yulin. These six armies were all part of the Weijun (衛軍).

Based on Wang Zhongwu's report, it can be inferred that Parhae's military system also adopted the Tang Dynasty's model, with both Weijun and local militias (Fubing). The Tang Dynasty system had separate Weijun and Fubing units, numbering over 600 nationwide. Each unit had a Langjiang (郞將) and was placed under the control of the Zhuwei (諸衛). This strict and extensive military organization greatly influenced Parhae, establishing the ten guards and units like the Shencejun/Shinchaekgun.

No historical records explicitly state that Parhae adopted the Tang Dynasty's Fubing system. However, considering Parhae's long-term territorial expansion and the presence of military officials such as Jasa, Rangjang, Gwaidowi, and Byeoljang, it is likely that Parhae implemented a Fubing system. Additionally, the New Book of Tang mentions that "Parhae's Buyeo Province is located on the border with the Khitans, and strong troops are always stationed there to defend against the Khitans," suggesting that Parhae had local militias similar to the Tang Dynasty's Fubing system, which played a crucial role in securing the borders. Military titles such as Langjiang/Rangjang and Biejiang/Byeoljang (别將) emerged during King Tae Muye's reign, indicating that Parhae had already implemented an army system modeled after the Tang Dynasty with central and local forces.

The size of the military grew from a few thousand soldiers in the early days to tens of thousands in later periods. It is known that in its early years, during the reign of King Mu, Parhae held 100,000 troops, which is one-third of Goguryeo's 300,000-strong army. Naturally, during periods of military control combined with production and conquest, even the elderly, children, and all men in a household might have been conscripted to meet the demands of external wars.

== Language ==
=== Identification ===
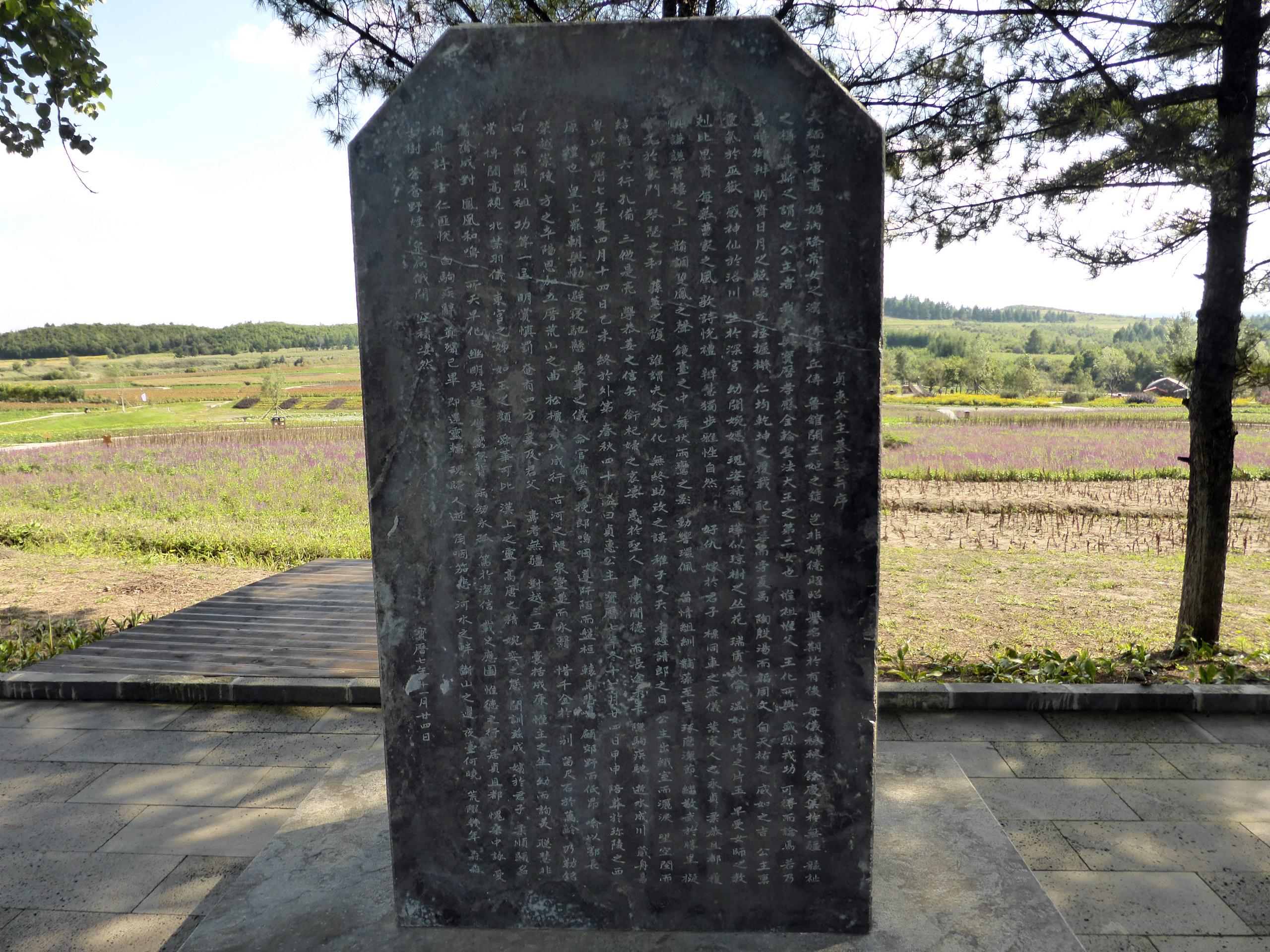
Replica of the epitaph of Princess Chŏnghye (Zhenhui), the second daughter of Mun of Parhae (r. 737–793), written in Classical Chinese

Parhae
- Bohai
- Native to: Parhae
- Region: Northeast China, North Korea and the Russian Far East
- Ethnicity: Parhae
- Language family: Unclassified; Koreanic? Tungusic?
- Writing system: Unknown native script Chinese characters (Classical Chinese)

Language codes
- ISO 639-3: –

Parhae used multiple languages but the indigenous language of Parhae is unclear, as no extant text or gloss of the language has survived. Daniel Kane and Marc Hideo Miyake state that Tungusic, Koreanic, Para-Japonic, and Amuric are all possible language families that could have existed in Parhae.

Alexander Vovin argues that the ethnic and linguistic properties of Goguryeo and Parhae elites were the same considering the overlap in territory between Parhae and Goguryeo, the Parhae founder's position as a general of Goguryeo, and the existence of loanwords in the Jurchen language likely derived from Old Korean. Therefore Vovin suggests that the Parhae elites spoke a variety of Old Korean, which had a lasting impact on Khitan, Jurchen and Manchu languages. However, Vovin also believes that the vast majority of the Parhae population were probably Tungusic, and at least partially Jurchen-speaking. On the other hand, while Richard McBride is receptive to other shared traits between Goguryeo and Parhae, he views the equivocation between their languages with skepticism. McBride characterizes such a claim as speculation due to the scarcity of surviving materials on either languages. Similarly, Jae Jung Song states that Goguryeo evolved into Parhae but they may not have been dominated by Koreanic speaking people.

Some Korean historians believe that a record in the Shoku Nihongi implies that the Parhae and Silla language were mutually intelligible: a student sent from Silla to Japan for Japanese language interpreter training assisted a diplomatic envoy from Parhae in communicating with the audience of a Japanese court.

Based on Shavkunov's research, one term that the people of Parhae used to describe "a king" was Gadokbu, which is related to the words kadalambi (management) of the Manchu language and kadokuotto of the Nanai language.

=== Script ===
According to the Old Book of Tang, the Parhae had writing and records. A later Chinese text called the Gu jin qi guan, dated to the 15th-16th centuries, describes their script as similar to the paw prints of animals and birds. While the script could have been used to represent Old Korean or a Tungusic language, the description of the native script suggests that it looked significantly different from Chinese or Old Korean script, which was based on Chinese.

Excavated epigraphic materials indicate that the Chinese script was the only widely used script in Parhae. All major surviving Parhae texts are written in Chinese, including communications between Parhae and Japan, steles of Parhae royalty, and inscriptions on Buddhist statues. Diplomatic missions between Parhae, Japan and the Tang dynasty were primarily conducted in the Chinese language. Documents and poetry exchanged between Parhae and Japan were written in Classical Chinese. Based on administrative and diplomatic records, a number of Japanese historians and linguists further suggest that Chinese was the lingua franca of Parhae. Chinese characters were used for elite monuments, such as two unearthed tomb inscriptions for members of the Parhae royal family, as well as common items such as clay vessels.

Some of the names of Parhae's emissaries were similar to Chinese names while others were unique to Parhae: Wodala, Zhaoheshi, and Nansali. The unique Parhae names were the minority. While most Parhae inscriptions consist of common Chinese characters, Vovin has identified a small number of characters that are only found elsewhere in the Jurchen script. These characters appear on Parhae tiles and resemble the Jurchen characters for pi, ni, in, and ir. The meanings of these characters have not been deciphered. Based on these findings, Vovin believes that the Parhae script was a prototype of the Jurchen script, but also notes that because Parhae was a multi-ethnic state, the Jurchen-related characters could have also been used to transcribe Korean names. Kane and Miyake suggest that the Parhae script, Khitan large script, and Jurchen script are all branches of a hypothetical Xiongnu script.

A stone slab with a runic inscription similar to Turkic runes dating roughly to the Parhae period was discovered in Ussuriysk, Primorsky Krai. The runes were carved in the negative for creating a seal impression. Shavkunov identified the runes with specific Turkic letters and reads it as "Suyubin", which corresponds with the Parhae province of Solbin/Shuaibin and the Razdolnaya river, called Suifen in Mandarin Chinese and Suifun in the Manchu language. As a result, Shavkunov proposed that Turkic writing was used among the broader Parhae society. No other runic inscriptions have been found on Parhae monuments.

== Economy and trade ==
Under Parhae, the region's agriculture became much more widespread and well-developed than in previous centuries, especially in the north. Millet, barley, soy beans and rice were the main type of crops cultivated in Parhae. Some of its specialized regional produce, such as rice, fermented beans, plums and pears, were much sought after. Fishing and hunting also remained important among Parhae people. Parhae also produced fine iron and copper wares, silk and linen textiles, and ceramics, including Sancai pottery developed under the influence of that of the Tang. Whaling was also done, albeit this was mostly done as tribute to the Tang.

Parhae had a high level of craftsmanship and engaged in trade with neighboring polities such as the Göktürks, Nara Japan, Later Silla and the Tang dynasty. Parhae sent a large number of envoys to Japan, called Bokkaishi. Fur from Parhae was exported to Japan while textile products and precious metals, such as gold and mercury, were imported from Japan. In Japan, the fur of the 貂 (ten, i.e. sable or other marten) was very valuable due to its popularity among Japanese aristocrats. Similarly, Parhae builders used Japanese fortification techniques with prevailing Japanese culture in their construction of the port of An. Parhae's musical works Shinmaka (Japanese: 新靺鞨) have been preserved by the Japanese court.

== Controversies ==
The historic position of Parhae is disputed between Korean, Chinese, Russian, and Japanese historians. Korean scholars consider Parhae to be the successor state of Goguryeo, and part of the Northern and Southern States period of Korean history. Chinese scholars argue that Parhae was a local administration of the Tang dynasty and composed of Mohe people, making it a part of Chinese history due to its close cultural and political ties with Tang China. The Russian position views Parhae as a state of primarily Mohe people, while Japanese scholars consider it a tributary state.

== Media ==
Parhae features in the Korean film Shadowless Sword, which is about the last prince of Parhae. The Korean TV drama Dae Jo-yeong, which aired from 16 September 2006, to 23 December 2007, was about the founder of Parhae.

Parhae is the name of the lunar research facility in the Korean TV series, The Silent Sea.

== See also ==
- Ancient Tombs at Longtou Mountain
- History of Korea
- History of Manchuria
- History of China
- Goguryeo
- Goryeo
- List of Provinces of Balhae
- List of Balhae monarchs

== Bibliography ==
- Bielenstein, Hans (2005), Diplomacy and Trade in the Chinese World, 589-1276, BRILL, ISBN 9789047407614
- Mark Byington (7–8 October 2004). "A Matter of Territorial Security: Chinese Historiographical Treatment of Koguryo in the Twentieth Century". International Conference on Nationalism and Textbooks in Asia and Europe, Seoul, The Academy of Korean Studies.
- Byington, Mark E. (2016), The Ancient State of Puyŏ in Northeast Asia: Archaeology and Historical Memory, Cambridge (Massachusetts) and London: Harvard University Asia Center, ISBN 978-0-674-73719-8
- 孫玉良 (1992). 渤海史料全編. 吉林文史出版社 ISBN 978-7-80528-597-9
- McBride, Richard D. (2024), The Three Kingdoms of Korea: Lost Civilizations, Reaktion Books
- Crossley, Pamela Kyle (1997), The Manchus, Blackwell Publishing
- Dillon, Michael (2016), Encyclopedia of Chinese History, Taylor & Francis
- Franke, Herbert; Twitchett, Denis (1994), "Introduction", in Franke, Herbert; Twitchett, Denis (eds.), Alien Regimes and Border States, 907–1368, The Cambridge History of China, vol. 6, Cambridge University Press, pp. 1–42, ISBN 978-0-521-24331-5
- Jee, Jonghyun; Kim, Byungjun; Jun, Bong Gwan (2024), "The role of English Wikipedia in mediating East Asian historical disputes: the case of Balhae", Asian Journal of Communication, Routledge
- Kane, Daniel; Miyake, Marc Hideo (2023), "5: Jurchen", The Tungusic Languages, Taylor & Francis
- Kim, Alexander (2011a), Relations Between Bohai and Silla (7th to 9th Centuries): A Critical Analysis
- Kim, Alexander (2011), The Historiography of Bohai in Russia
- Kim, Alexander (2011b), On the Origin of the Jurchen People (A Study Based on Russian Sources)
- Kim, Alexander (2015), The Problem of the Ethnic Composition of the Bohai State – A Comparative Analysis of Russian and Korean Materials
- Kim, Alexander (2019), Relations between the Bohai people and the Koryŏ kingdom
- Kim, Jong-bok (2014a), A Buffer Zone for Peace: Andong Protectorate and Diplomatic Relations between Silla, Balhae, and Tang in the 8th to 10th Centuries, Korea Journal
- Lee, Peter H. (2010). Sourcebook of Korean Civilization: Volume One: From Early Times to the 16th Century. Columbia University Press. ISBN 9780231515290.
- Mote, F.W. (1999), Imperial China, 900-1800, Harvard University Press, pp. 49, 61–62, ISBN 978-0-674-01212-7
- Reckel, Johannes (2015), Review of A New History of Parhae
- Rossabi, Morris (1983). China Among Equals: The Middle Kingdom and Its Neighbors, 10th-14th Centuries. University of California Press. ISBN 9780520045620.
- Seth, Michael J. (2020), A Concise History of Korea
- Shin, Michael D. (2014), Korean History in Maps
- Twitchett, Denis (1994), "The Liao", The Cambridge History of China, Volume 6, Alien Regime and Border States, 907–1368, Cambridge: Cambridge University Press, pp. 43–153, ISBN 0521243319
- Sloane, Jesse D. (2014), Mapping a Stateless Nation: "Bohai" Identity in the Twelfth to Fourteenth Centuries
- Sloane, Jesse D. (2014a), Parhae in Historiography and Archaeology: International Debate and Prospects for Resolution
- Song, Jae Jung (2005), The Korean Language: Structure, use and context, Routledge
- Pozzi, Alessandra; Janhunen, Juha Antero; Weiers, Michael, eds. (2006). Tumen Jalafun Jecen Aku: Manchu Studies in Honour of Giovanni Stary. Vol. 20 of Tunguso Sibirica. Contributor Giovanni Stary. Otto Harrassowitz Verlag. ISBN 978-3447053785.
- Wang, Zhenping (2013), Tang China in Multi-Polar Asia: A History of Diplomacy and War, University of Hawaii Press
