= List of battles involving Korea =

This is a list of land and naval battles involving Korea.

== Ancient period ==
=== Gojoseon ===
- Gojoseon–Yan War
- Han conquest of Gojoseon

== Three Kingdoms ==
=== Goguryeo ===
- Goguryeo–Wa War
- Iwai Rebellion
- Battle of Jwawon
- Goguryeo–Wei War
- Battle of Biryusu
- Battle of Linyuguan
- Battle of Salsu
- Siege of Liaodong (612)
- Siege of Liaodong (645)
- Siege of Ansi
- Battle of Sasu
- Siege of Pyeongyang (668)

=== Baekje ===
- Battle of Chiyang
- Battle of Baekgang, a battle between Baekje and Japanese forces and the Tang–Silla alliance.

=== Silla ===
- Battle of Gwansan
- Battle of Hwangsanbeol

== North–South States ==
=== Unified Silla ===
- Battle of Maeso

=== Balhae ===
- Battle of Cheonmun-ryeong

== Goryeo ==
=== Khitan invasions of Korea ===
- Battle of Guju

=== Korean–Jurchen border conflicts ===
- Korean–Jurchen border conflicts

=== Mongol invasions of Korea ===
- Battle of Cheoin
- Battle of Chungju (1253)
- Siege of Kuju

=== Mongol invasions of Japan ===
- Battle of Bun'ei
- Battle of Kōan

== Joseon ==
=== Early period ===
- Gihae Eastern Expedition
- Disturbance of the Three Ports
- Korean–Jurchen border conflicts

=== During the Imjin War ===
- Battle of Busan (1592), a naval battle of the Seven Year War.
- Battle of Okpo, naval battle of 1592.
- Battle of Sacheon (1592), a naval battle of the Seven Year War.
- Battle of Hansan Island in 1592, a key naval battle of the Seven Year War.
- Siege of Jinju (1592)
- Battle of Haengju
- Battle of Chilcheollyang, a naval battle of the Seven Year War in 1597.
- Battle of Myeongnyang, a naval battle of 1597 in the Seven Year War.
- Battle of Noryang, a naval battle of 1598.
- Battle of Sangju - a Japanese advancement,
- Battle of Chungju - Japanese decisive victory
- Siege of Busan - Japanese take Busan

=== Late period ===
- Battle of Sarhū, a series of Manchu–Ming battles in 1619.
- Later Jin invasion of Joseon
- Siege of Namhan
- Sino-Russian border conflicts
- Battle of Ganghwa (1866)
- General Sherman incident
- Bombardment of the Selee River Forts
- Battle of Ganghwa (1871)
- Battle of Ganghwa (1875)

== Battles of the Korean independence movement ==
- Battle of Samdunja
- Battle of Fengwudong (Battle of Bong-o-dong)
- Hunchun incident
- Battle of Qingshanli (Battle of Cheongsanri)
- Free City Incident
- Pacification of Manchukuo
- Battle of Pochonbo
- Aerial engagements of the 1931-1945 Sino-Japanese War
- Asia-Pacific theater of World War II
  - China Burma India Theater
    - Pacification of Manchukuo
    - Aerial engagements of the 1931-1945 Sino-Japanese War
    - Burma campaign
  - South-East Asian theatre of World War II
    - Burma campaign
  - Soviet–Japanese War
    - Seishin Operation

== 1931-1945 Sino-Japanese War ==
- Pacification of Manchukuo
- Battle of Pochonbo
- Aerial engagements of the 1931-1945 Sino-Japanese War

== World War II ==
- Asia-Pacific theater of World War II
  - China Burma India Theater
    - Pacification of Manchukuo
    - Aerial engagements of the 1931-1945 Sino-Japanese War
    - Burma campaign
  - South-East Asian theatre of World War II
    - Burma campaign
  - Soviet–Japanese War
    - Seishin Operation

== Korean War ==
- First Battle of Seoul
- Battle of Osan, one of the first Korean War engagements, in 1950
- Battle of Inchon, a decisive battle of the Korean War in 1950
- Battle of the Imjin River, a 1951 battle of the Korean War
- Battle of Bloody Ridge
- Battle of Chosin Reservoir
- Battle of Old Baldy
- Battle of Heartbreak Ridge
- Battle of Hill Eerie
- Battle of the Hook
- Battle of Kapyong, a 1951 battle of the Korean War
- Second Battle of Seoul
- Third Battle of Seoul
- Operation Ripper
- Operation Commando
- Operation Courageous
- Operation Tomahawk
- Outpost Harry
- Battle of Pakchon
- Battle of White Horse

== Engagements of the Republic of Korea (South Korea) ==
- Korean War
- Vietnam War
  - Operation Van Buren
  - Operation Geronimo
  - Operation Irving
  - Operation Masher/White Wing
  - Operation Crazy Horse
  - Battle of Đức Cơ
  - Battle of Trà Bình
  - Operation Hong Kil Dong
  - Operation Pershing
  - Operation Hood River
  - Operation Dragon Fire
  - Operation Imperial Lake
  - Tết offensive on Đà Nẵng
  - Operation Pipestone Canyon
- Persian Gulf War
- First Battle of Yeonpyeong
- Second Battle of Yeonpyeong
- Battle of Daecheong
- Bombardment of Yeonpyeong
- Operation Dawn of Gulf of Aden

== Engagements of the Democratic People's Republic of Korea (North Korea) ==
- Korean War
- Vietnam War
  - Operation Rolling Thunder
- Yom Kippur War
- Angolan Civil War
- Ugandan Bush War
- Battle of Amami-Ōshima
- First Battle of Yeonpyeong
- Second Battle of Yeonpyeong
- Battle of Daecheong
- Bombardment of Yeonpyeong
- Russian invasion of Ukraine
  - Kursk campaign

== First Zeitun resistance (1915) ==
- Military history of Korea
- Military of South Korea
- Lists of battles

== See also ==
- Military history of Korea
