= Military history of Korea =

Korea's military history spans thousands of years, beginning with the ancient nation of Gojoseon and continuing into the present day with the countries of North Korea and South Korea, and is notable for its many successful triumphs over invaders.

Throughout its history, Korea has boasted numerous exceptional leaders who gained outstanding victories against numerically superior enemies. Famed leaders credited with defending Korea against foreign invasions include: Ŭlchi Mundŏk of Goguryeo, who defeated Sui China during the Goguryeo–Sui War; Yŏn Kaesomun of Goguryeo, who defeated Emperor Taizong of Tang China during the Goguryeo–Tang War; Kang Kam-ch'an of Goryeo, who defeated the Khitan Empire during the Goryeo-Khitan War; Ch'oe Yŏng and Yi Sŏnggye of Goryeo, who defeated the Red Turbans during the Red Turban Invasions; and Yi Sun-shin of Joseon, who defeated the Japanese at sea during the Imjin War.

Other notable leaders include: Gwanggaeto the Great of Goguryeo, who created a great empire in Northeast Asia through conquest, and subjugated the other Korean kingdoms of Baekje, Silla and Gaya to bring about a brief unification of the Three Kingdoms of Korea; Geunchogo of Baekje, who captured Pyongyang and established overseas territories to control much of the Korean Peninsula and dominate the seas; Munmu and Kim Yu-sin of Silla, who united the Three Kingdoms of Korea and defeated Tang China to gain complete control of the Korean peninsula; Dae Jo-yeong, who created Balhae from Goguryeo's ashes and reconquered Goguryeo lands lost during the Goguryeo-Tang War; Jang Bogo of Later Silla, who created a maritime empire and commanded a powerful fleet; Wang Kŏn, who united the Later Three Kingdoms of Korea and established Goryeo as the successor to Goguryeo; and Yun Kwan of Goryeo, who defeated the Jurchens and constructed nine fortresses in Manchuria.

During the Cold War, South Korean troops actively participated in the Vietnam War, contributing the second largest foreign military contingent after the United States. North Korea also contributed soldiers, military equipment and advisors to several conflicts during the Cold War in support of the Communist bloc, including the Yom Kippur War, Ethiopian Civil War, and Ugandan Bush War.

Today, both North Korea and South Korea field some of the largest and most lethal armies in the world. On one hand, North Korea is widely suspected of having nuclear weapons, as well as other weapons of mass destruction. South Korea, for its part, is equipped with a sophisticated conventional military with state-of-the-art weapons. South Korea currently serves in several UN peacekeeping missions around the world. The South Korean military enjoys military alliances with other countries, particularly the United States.

== Timeline ==
=== Gojoseon ===
- Gojoseon–Yan War – 4th century B.C.
- Han conquest of Gojoseon – 109–108 BC

=== Buyeo ===
- Mohe conquest

=== Proto–Three Kingdoms of Korea ===
==== Goguryeo ====
- Continuous battles with the Four Commanderies of Han
  - Battle of Jwawon
  - Xuantu Conquest – 302
  - Lelang Conquest – 313
  - Daifang Conquest – 314
- Gongsun Du's Campaign against Goguryeo – 190
- Goguryeo-Wei War – 244
- Xianbei Conquest
- Khitan Conquest

==== Baekje ====
- Malgal Conquest
- Conquest of Mahan by Baekje

==== Silla ====
- Conquest of Jinhan by Silla
- Campaign with Gaya

==== Gaya ====
- Campaign with Silla

=== Three Kingdoms period ===
==== Goguryeo campaigns ====
- Campaign of Geunchogo of Baekje: Conquest of Pyongyang
- Baekje Campaign of Gwanggaeto the Great of Goguryeo
- Attack from Gwanggaeto the Great of Goguryeo
  - Gaya confederacy Campaign
  - Goguryeo–Yamato War
- Campaigns of Gwanggaeto the Great of Goguryeo
  - Xianbei Campaign
  - Malgal Conquest
  - Khitan Conquest
  - Buyeo Conquest

==== Goguryeo, Baekje–Silla Alliance War ====
- Campaign of Jangsu of Goguryeo against Silla and Baekje
- Invasion of Baekje–Silla alliance – 475
- Campaign of Baekje–Silla–Gaya armies against Goguryeo
- Battle of Gwansan – 554
- Gaya confederacy Annexation – 532/562

==== Other conflicts ====
- The Baekje Conquest of Tamna – 498
- The Silla Conquest of Usan – 512

==== Goguryeo–Sui War (598–614) ====
- Goguryeo–Sui War – 598

==== Goguryeo–Tang War (645–668) ====
- First conflict of the Goguryeo–Tang War – 645
  - Battle of Ansi — 645
  - Battle of Mount Jupil — 645
- Battle of Sasu — 662
- Battle of Geumsan — 667

Including Goguryeo and Baekje alliance against Tang and Silla

==== Baekje–Tang War (660–663) ====
- Baekje–Tang War – 660

==== Silla–Tang War (668–676) ====
- Other rebellions from Baekje and Goguryeo people
- Battle of Maeso fortress

=== North South States period ===
==== Balhae ====
- Battle of Tianmenling – War of Foundation – 698
- Balhae expedition to Dengzhou – 732
- Balhae-Silla Conflicts
- Conquest of Balhae by Khitan – 926

==== Silla (676–935) ====
- Campaigns of Chang Pogo
- Kim Hŏnch'ang Rebellion
- Red Pants Rebellion
- Ungjin Commandery Conquest – 676
- Gyerim Territory Area Command Conquest – 735
- Protectorate General to Pacify the East Conquest – 773
- Ajagae Rebellion
- Ki Hwŏn Rebellion
- Yang Kil Rebellion
- Later Three Kingdoms – 900~936

=== Goryeo dynasty ===
==== Goryeo wars ====
- Northern Expansion of Manchuria
- Goryeo-Khitan War
  - First conflict in the Goryeo–Khitan War
  - Second conflict in the Goryeo–Khitan War
  - Third conflict in the Goryeo–Khitan War (see also Battle of Gwiju)
- Campaigns of General Yun Kwan against the Jurchens (see also Korean-Jurchen border conflicts)
- Mongol invasions of Korea
- Sambyeolcho Rebellion
- Mongol invasions of Japan
  - First Mongol invasion of Japan
  - Second Mongol invasion of Japan
- Dongnyeong Conquest – 1290
- Ssangseong Conquest – 1356
- Red Turban invasions of Goryeo
- Liaoyang campaign – 1370
- War against Japanese piracy
  - 1st Tsushima invasion

==== Internal strife ====
- Yi Cha-gyŏm Rebellion
- Myo Cheong Rebellion
- Military Coup of 1170
- Kim Po-dang Rebellion
- Cho Wi-ch'ong Rebellion
- Mangi and Mangsoi Rebellion
- Kim Sami and Hyosim Rebellion
- Slave rebellion by Manjeok
- Wihwado Retreat

=== Joseon dynasty ===
==== Conflicts ====
- 2nd Tsushima Conquest (Gihae Eastern expedition) – 1419
- Japanese riots in Southeast Korea (1510)
- Seven Year War (Imjin) – 1592–1598
- Northern expedition against Manchus (see also Korean-Jurchen border conflicts)
- Later Jin invasion of Joseon – 1627
- Qing invasion of Joseon – 1636
- Russian-Manchu border conflicts – 1654–1658
- French campaign against Korea
- General Sherman Incident
- United States expedition to Korea
- Ganghwa Island incident

==== Nationwide Internal strifes ====
- Yi Si-ae's Rebellion
- Yi Gwal's Rebellion
- Hong Gyeong-Rae's Rebellion
- Imo Incident
- Donghak Peasant Revolution

=== Korean Empire ===
==== Conflicts ====
- Korean invasion of Manchuria
- Namdaemun Battle

=== 1910–1945: Colonial period ===
- Campaigns of Independence Forces
  - Battle of Qingshanli
  - Battle of Fengwudong
  - Free City Incident
- Actions of Korean Liberation Army
  - South-East Asian theatre of World War II

=== After 1945 ===
- Korean War
  - Korean DMZ Conflict
- Vietnam War
  - South Korea in the Vietnam War
- Gulf War
- War in Afghanistan
- Iraq War
  - Zaytun Division
- North Korean involvement in the Russo-Ukrainian war (2022–present)

== See also ==
- History of Korea
- Military of North Korea
- Military of South Korea
- Naval history of Korea
- List of battles of Korea
- List of wars involving South Korea
- North Korea and weapons of mass destruction
- War Memorial of Korea
