= 太 =

太 or 태, meaning 'excel', may refer to:

- Futoshi, a masculine Japanese given name
- Masaru, a masculine Japanese given name
- Tae, a Korean surname
- Tai (disambiguation), Chinese transliteration

== See also ==
- Ta (kana)
- Tae (disambiguation)
