= Dae (surname) =

- Hangul: 대
- Hanja: 大
- RR: Dae
- MR: Tae

Dae, also spelled Tae, is a rare Korean family name. The 2000 South Korean census found 606 people with this surname, from 194 households. There were two different clans: one based in Miryang and the other based in Taesan. In a study by the National Institute of the Korean Language based on 2007 application data for South Korean passports, it was found that the majority of people with this family name spelled it in Latin letters as Dae. The Dae surname is of Balhae origin, originating from the ruling House of Dae that ruled Balhae. Its last crown prince, Tae Kwanghyŏn, fled to Goryeo, and his descendants would bear either the Dae (대씨; 大氏) or Tae (태씨; 太氏) surnames.

== Notable people ==
- Dae Jo-yeong, founder of Balhae
- Tae Kwanghyŏn, crown prince of Balhae who fled to Goryeo
- Tae Tosu, Goryeo general, son of Kwanghyŏn
- Tae Kŭmch'wi, Goryeo military commander

== See also ==
- Korean name
