= Yŏl Manhwa =

King of Chŏngan

- King of Chŏngan
- Reign: 938–976
- Successor: O Hyŏnmyŏng
- Died: 976

Yŏl Manhwa (Korean: 열만화) or Lie Wanhua (Chinese: 烈萬華; ?–976, r. 938–976) was the first king of Chŏngan (Ding'an), a successor state to the kingdom of Balhae (Bohai), centered near the Yalu River.

== Biography ==
Yŏl Manhwa served a general of Later Balhae (Later Bohai), after the fall of Balhae to the Liao dynasty. In 938, Yŏl overthrew the ruling Dae clan and proclaimed himself as the king of the state of Chŏngan, with the aid of Oh Je-hyeon (오제현; 烏濟顯) and the Oh clan. In 970, King Yŏl Manhwa sent tribute to the Song dynasty during the reign of Emperor Taizu. However, in 976, Yŏl Manhwa himself was overthrown by the O clan, by O Chehyŏn's descendant, O Hyŏnmyŏng (Wu Xuanming).
