= Korean Military =

Korean Military may refer to

- Korean People's Army, the military of North Korea
- Republic of Korea Armed Forces, the military of South Korea

== See also ==
- Military history of Korea, for information about the Korean military prior to the division of Korea
