= Tianqing =

Tianqing (天慶) was a Chinese era name used by several emperors of China. It may refer to:

- Tianqing (1029–1030), or Cheongyeong, era name used by Dae Yeon-rim
- Tianqing (1111–1120), era name used by Emperor Tianzuo of Liao
- Tianqing (1194–1206), era name used by Emperor Huanzong of Western Xia

== See also ==
- Tian Qing (born 1986), Chinese badminton player
