= 2nd Marine Division (South Korea) =

Unit of the Republic of Korea Marine Corps

2nd Marine Infantry Division
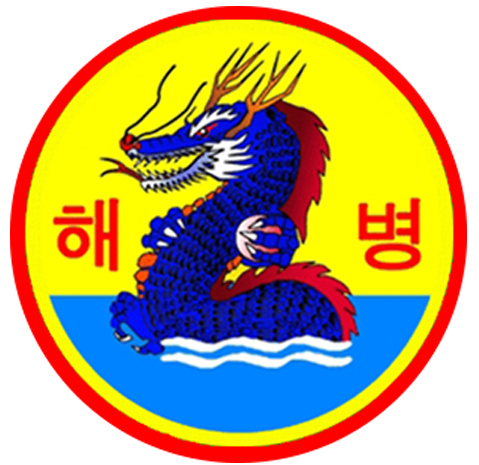
- Active: 20 September 1965 – 16 April 1981 (brigade); 16 April 1981 – present (division) (45 years, 6 months)
- Country: South Korea
- Branch: Republic of Korea Marine Corps
- Type: Infantry Division
- Size: Division
- Part of: ROK Marine Corps Headquarters
- Garrison/HQ: Gimpo, Gyeonggi Province
- Nickname: Cheongryong (Blue Dragon)
- Engagements: Vietnam War; Operation Van Buren; Battle of Tra Binh Dong; Operation Hood River; Operation Dragon Fire; Operation Pipestone Canyon; Operation Imperial Lake
- Decorations: U.S. Presidential Unit Citation; ROK Presidential Unit Citation

The 2nd Marine Infantry Division (Korean: 제2해병사단; Hanja: 第2海兵師團), also known as Blue Dragon Division (Korean: 청룡부대; Hanja: 青龍部隊) or more literally the Aqua (color) Dragon Division, is an infantry division of the Republic of Korea Marine Corps.

== History ==
On June 1, 1965, Prime Minister of South Vietnam Nguyễn Cao Kỳ requested military aid from South Korea. To support South Vietnam from communist North Vietnam, Korea State Council agreed to send a Division and its supporting units on July 2, and National Assembly of South Korea made final decision to send troops on August 13.

On August 17, the Republic of Korea Marine Corps attached various battalions, companies, and platoons to the 2nd Marine Regiment to increase its size to a brigade. The Marine Corps originally planned battalion to regiment size unit, but reports from Vietnam said that separating army and Marines was more appropriate to operate.

With President Park Chung Hee in attendance, the 2nd Marine Brigade was formally activated at the ROK Marine Corps training camp at Pohang on September 20, 1965.

The 2nd Marine Brigade was a mostly volunteer group that included many of South Korea's early Chaebols (Lee Kun-Hee, Ohn Jee-won, Chung Mong-koo), intellectuals and staunch anti-communists. Drafting only took place from November 4, 1967, following the heavy casualties of Operation Dragon Fire.

=== Vietnam War ===
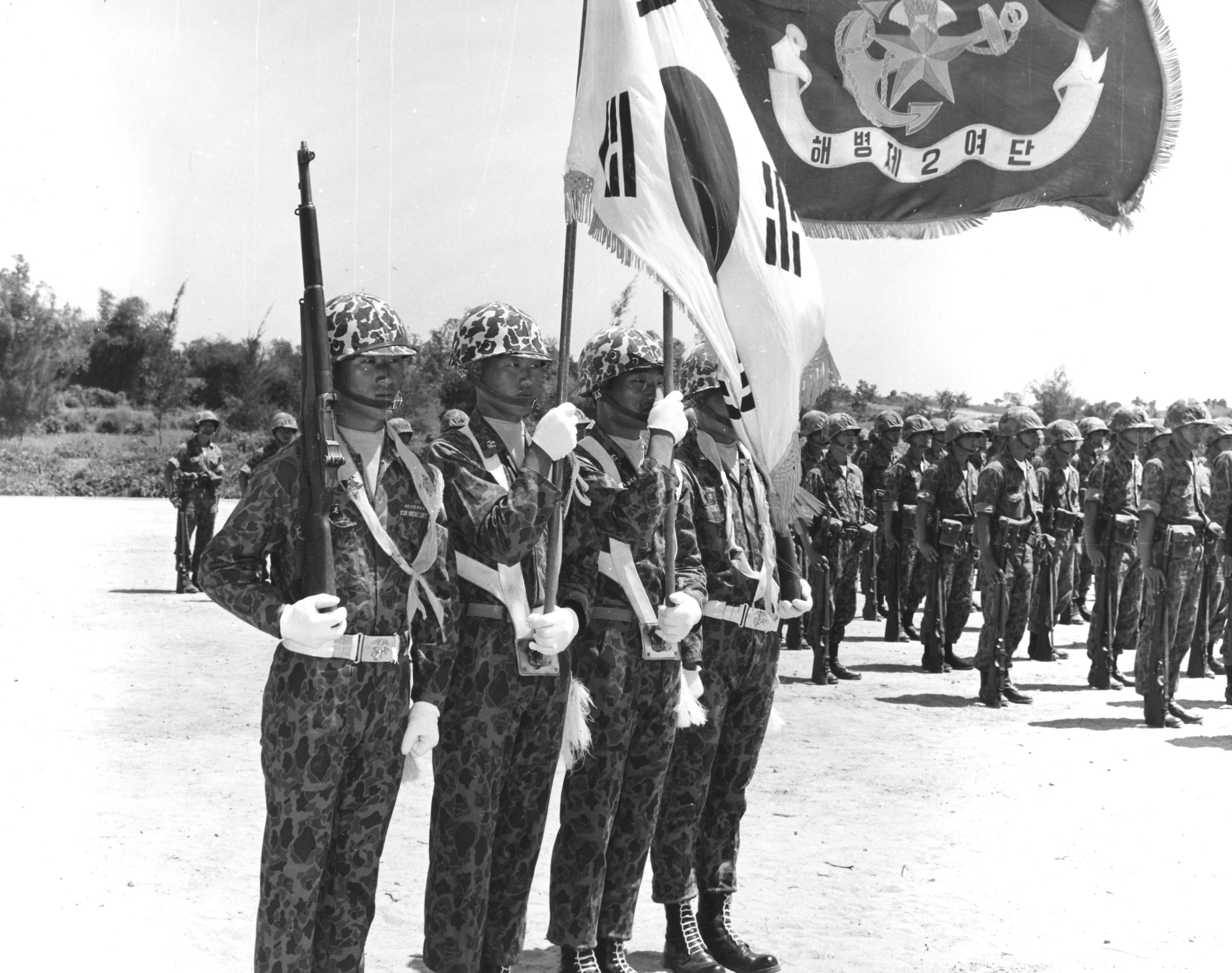
Brigade Color Guard during the first anniversary of the arrival of the 2nd Republic of Korea Marine Brigade in South Vietnam

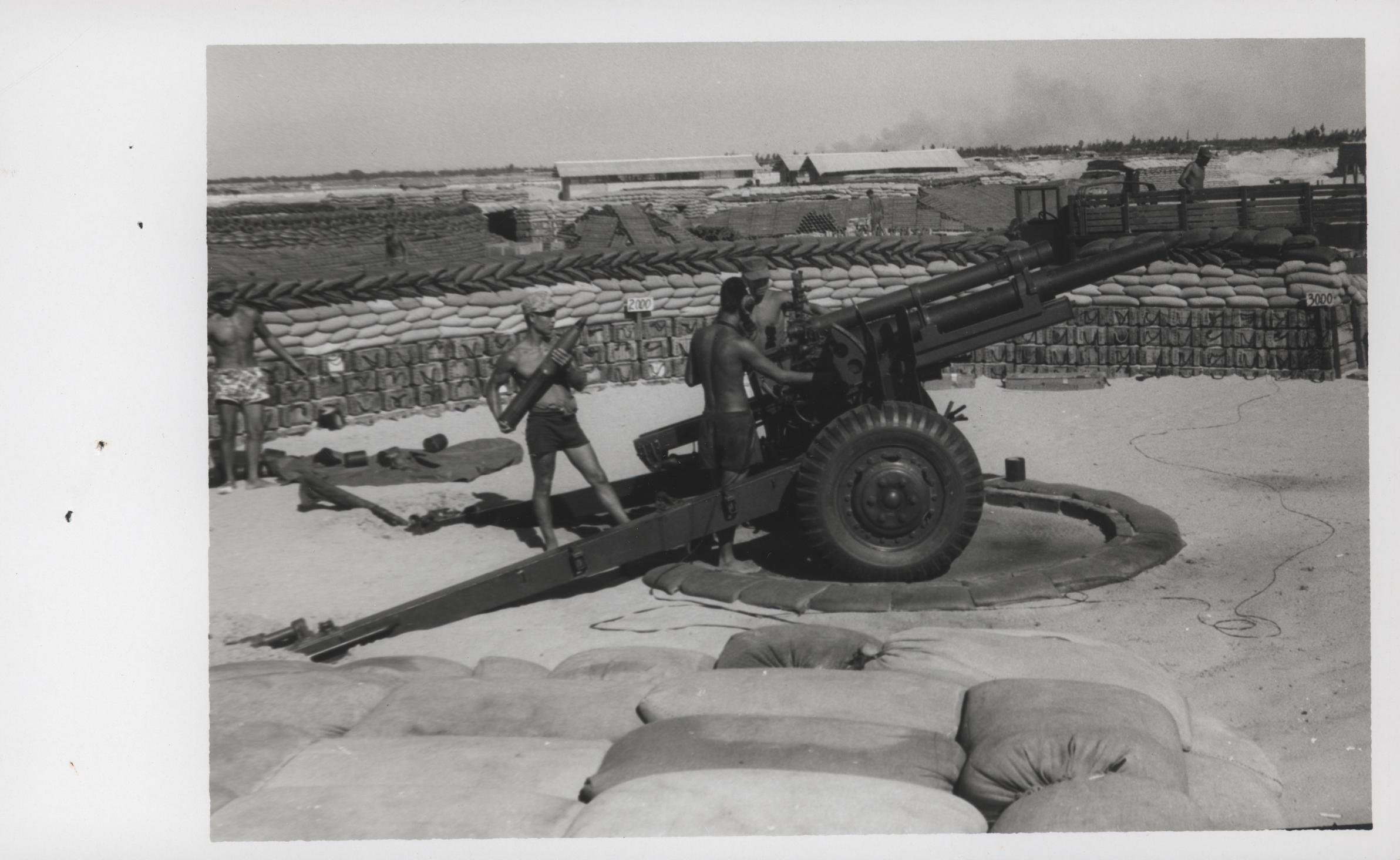
2nd Brigade gunners fire a 105mm from their base near Hoi An, 10 July 1968

The Blue Dragons were initially deployed to Cam Ranh Bay in September 1965, but in December moved to Tuy Hòa to provide security against the People's Army of Vietnam (PAVN) 95th Regiment.

In August 1966, the Blue Dragons moved to Chu Lai and was placed under the operational control of the III Marine Amphibious Force (III MAF). Under an arrangement with the USMC, air assets would be provided to the brigade and assigned the same priority for available aircraft as American units. A team from Subunit One, 1st ANGLICO was dispatched and charged with the mission of keeping an air umbrella over the Blue Dragon Brigade in and out of the field. A two-man fire control team was assigned to each ROKMC infantry company at all times.

Initially, the AK-47-equipped Vietcong (VC) and PAVN had somewhat superior small-arms to South Korean soldiers, since they were armed with World War II-era weaponry (M1 Garand and M1 carbine), although ROK forces like others relied on overwhelming use of heavy artillery and air support against small-arms and mortar units. They later received more modern weapons from the United States military such as the M16 rifle.

Significant operations and actions involving the Brigade include:

- Operation Lightning in Khánh Hòa Province from 8 to 14 November 1965
- Operation Flying Tiger: in early January 1966, joint operation with U.S./Army of the Republic of Vietnam (ARVN) Forces.
- Operation Van Buren: a rice harvest security operation with the 101st Airborne Division and ARVN in Phú Yên Province from 19 January to 21 February 1966 results in US claims of 346 VC killed for the loss of 45 ROK and 55 U.S.
- Operation Longstreet, an engineering security operation in Bình Định and Phú Yên Provinces
- Operation Lee: with the ARVN 4th Regiment in Quảng Ngãi Province from 3 to 10 October 1966
- Battle of Tra Binh Dong: on 15 February 1967, 11th Company of the Blue Dragons was dug in near the village of Tra Binh Dong in Quảng Nam Province when they were attacked by an estimated three VC Battalions supported by heavy mortar and recoilless rifle fire. The VC launched secondary attacks on each flank of the company before attacking with one Battalion against the Company center, breaching the perimeter and using flamethrowers and bangalore torpedoes against the company's bunkers. The Company counterattacked and with the aid of a South Korean Marine quick reaction company helidropped into the position succeeded in driving back the VC with ROK forces claiming to have killed 243.
- Operation Giant Dragon: in Quảng Ngãi Province from 17 to 22 February results in ROK claims of 16 VC killed and 61 weapons captured
- Operation Dragon Fire: in Quảng Ngãi Province from 5 September to 30 October 1967 claims that 541 VC were killed.
- The recapture of Hội An: during the Tet Offensive
- Operation Daring Rebel: a search and destroy operation with the ARVN 2nd Division and American forces on Barrier Island 24 km south of Danang, Bình Định Province from 5 to 20 May 1969 results in claims of 4 VC killed
- Operation Victory Dragon: on Go Noi Island, Quảng Nam Province from October 1968 to December 1970.
- Operation Pipestone Canyon: on Go Noi Island, Quảng Nam Province from 26 May to 7 November 1969.
- Operation Defiant Stand: an amphibious assault with the 1st Battalion, 26th Marines on 7 September 1969. This was the first amphibious assault ever conducted by the Republic of Korea Marine Corps
- Operation Hoang Dieu 101: with III MAF and the ARVN 51st Regiment in Quảng Nam Province from 17 December 1970 to 19 January 1971, unknown casualties
- Operation Golden Dragon II: a clear and search operation in Quảng Nam Province from 4 to 21 January 1971
- Operation Hoang Dieu 103: with III MAF and the ARVN 51st Regiment in Quảng Nam Province from 3 February to 10 March 1971

The conduct of ROK forces is praised by some South Korean participation in Vietnam states that "the Koreans were thorough in their planning and deliberate in their execution of a plan. They usually surrounded an area by stealth and quick movement. While the count of enemy killed was probably no greater proportionately than that of similar American combat units, the thoroughness with which the Koreans searched any area they fought in was attested to by the fact that the Koreans usually came out with a much higher weaponry count than American forces engaged in similar actions."

A total of 320,000 South Koreans served in the Vietnam War, with a peak strength (of any given time) at around 48,000. About 4,000 were killed.

==== Commanders during Vietnam War ====
- Sep 1965-1967 : Brig. Gen. Kim Yun-sang
- Oct 1967 : Brig. Gen. Yi Bong-chool
- 1970 : Brig. Gen. Lee Dong-yong

==== Order of battle during Vietnam War ====
2nd Marine Brigade

Direct Control Company
1st Marine Battalion
2nd Marine Battalion
3rd Marine Battalion
5th Marine Battalion
2nd Field Artillery Battalion
628th Field Artillery A Unit (Army)

==== Unit statistics for the Vietnam War ====
Start Date	End Date	Deployed			Combat			KIA			WIA		
Start Date	End Date	Officer	Non-officer	Total	Large	Small	Total	Officer	Non-officer	Total	Officer	Non-officer	Total
October 9, 1965	February 24, 1972	2,166	35,174	37,340	175	151,347	151,522	42	1,160	1,202	99	2,805	2,904

==== War crimes ====
In February 1968, soldiers of the Brigade were accused of perpetrating the Phong Nhị and Phong Nhất massacre.

In February 2023, The Seoul court awarded Nguyen Thi Thanh compensation of $24,000, with the judge finding that Nguyen's relatives were killed on the spot and the plaintiff seriously wounded, and that this is obviously illegal.

==== After the Vietnam War ====
After returning from the Vietnam War, the 2nd Marine Brigade was expanded and restructured into as the 2nd Marine Division in 1981.

== See also ==
- Republic of Korea Marine Corps
- 1st Marine Division
- Vietnam War
- Capital Mechanized Infantry Division
- 9th Infantry Division
- Republic of Korea Armed Forces
- Ganghwa Island shooting
