= Operation Dragon Fire =

- For the 1967 Vietnam War operation see Operation Dragon Fire (Vietnam)
- For the 2007 Iraq War operation list of coalition military operations of the Iraq War
