= Chŏngan =

938–986 state in Manchuria

Chŏngan 定安國 정안국
- 938–986
- Capital: Yongcheonbu
- Common languages: Unknown
- Religion: Unknown
- Government: Monarchy
- King
  - 938–976: Yŏl Manhwa (first)
  - 976–986: O Hyŏnmyŏng (last)
- History
  - Establishment: 938
  - Fall: 986
| Preceded by | Succeeded by |
| Parhae; Dongdan Kingdom | Goryeo dynasty; Liao dynasty |
- Today part of: China; North Korea

Chŏngan (Korean: 정안; Hanja: 定安) or Ding'an (Chinese: 定安國) was a state in Manchuria that existed from 938 to 986. It was the successor state of Parhae (Bohai) founded by Yŏl Manhwa (Lie Wanhua).

== History ==
The early history of Chŏngan is mostly unknown. Large number of rebels emerged in the former territory of Parhae after the kingdom's conquest by the Liao dynasty in 926, although most were quickly defeated by Liao forces. After the Liao puppet state of Dongdan was abolished and the main Liao forces left the region, General Yŏl Manhwa (Lie Wanhua) established Chŏngan in the mid-930s to prevent a full occupation by the Liao dynasty. Chŏngan is recorded to have enlisted the assistance of neighboring tribes with the hopes of overthrowing the Liao dynasty, but apparently failed to do so.

In 970, the king paid tribute to the Song dynasty together with the neighboring Jurchens. On all four occasions in which Chŏngan envoys were able to reach the Song court, they were attached to a Jurchen mission. Chŏngan was a poor state and was unable to send their own independent missions. The History of Song claims that the Chŏngan people's origin can be traced back to the former confederacy of Mahan. However, the Mahan confederacy in the distant south of the Korean peninsula had disappeared for almost a millennium by the 10th century, and Chinese scholars consider this record, written in the Yuan dynasty, to be an error. Meanwhile Korean historians consider the History of the Song to be accurate. Goguryeo (the predecessor to Parhae and Chŏngan) had traced part of its heritage with the Mahan as its lands were previously part of Goguryeo before it became Parhae territory, and Goguryeo had acquired it from Baekje. In a message to the Song emperor in 981, O Hyŏnmyŏng (Wu Xuanming) described his people as the "remaining commoners of Bohai" who lived in the former land of Goguryeo. The purpose of Chŏngan's tributary mission was a proposal for the Song and Chŏngan to ally and initiate a joint attack against the Liao, which the Song declined due to the Liao's military prowess. Oh also described his territory as having been heavily damaged by the Liao and was under threat of imminent destruction.

The Khitans did not recognize Chŏngan as a state and called their people the Ujae tribes.

In 975, a Parhae military commander named Yan Po rebelled at Huanglongfu (formerly Buyeo province in Parhae) and killed the director Zhang Ju. The Liao sent Yelü Helibi to put down the rebellion and after two months, Yan Po was defeated. Yan Po fled to Wure where he evaded capture and his pursuers returned empty handed. According to a communication between the Song emperor and the king of Jeongan, O Hyŏnmyŏng, in 981, Buyeo province had rebelled against the Khitans and become part of Jeongan.

In 976, the Yŏl clan was replaced by the Oh clan, and Chŏngan was ruled by O Hyŏnmyŏng until before it was finally destroyed by the Liao dynasty in 986 CE. Korean historians theorize that the Oh Clan's replacement of the Yŏl Clan may have been violent and could have played a role in the destruction of Chŏngan. According to the history book Goryeosa, tens of thousands of Parhae refugees fled to Goryeo in 979, and was recorded as the largest Parhae migration since the 936 exodus when Parhae Crown Prince Tae Kwanghyŏn had similarly led tens of thousands of refugees into Goryeo.

Although Chŏngan officially fell in 986, records indicate that Parhae resistance continued for several years, notably in 994. Yan Po was still active in 995 when it was reported that he and Wu Zhaodu of Wure invaded Tieli. The Liao responded with punitive campaigns until they established three military outposts in the lower Yalu River and completely occupied the area in 991. The last remnants of Parhae resistance from the former state of Chŏngan were destroyed by 999.

== Rulers ==
1. Yŏl Manhwa (열만화; 烈萬華; also Lie Wanhua; 938–976)
2. O Hyŏnmyŏng (오현명; 烏玄明; also Wu Xuanming; 976–986)

== See also ==
- Parhae
- Later Parhae
- Heungyo

== Bibliography ==
- Byington, Mark E. (2016), The Ancient State of Puyŏ in Northeast Asia: Archaeology and Historical Memory, Cambridge (Massachusetts) and London: Harvard University Asia Center, ISBN 978-0-674-73719-8
- Crossley, Pamela Kyle (2016). "Bohai/Parhae Identity and the Coherence of Dan gur under the Kitan/Liao Empire". International Journal of Korean History. 21 (1): 11–44. doi:10.22372/ijkh.2016.21.1.11.
