= Military of Korea =

Military of Korea could refer to:

- Military of North Korea, known as the Korean People's Army
- Military of South Korea, the armed forces of Republic of Korea
- Military history of Korea, the military history of Korean civilization
