= Hyopgye Tae clan =

Korean clan from North Hwanghae Province

- Country: Korea
- Current region: Singye County, North Hwanghae Province
- Founder: Tae Chungsang
- Members: T'ae Chipsŏng; Tae Yong-ho

The Hyopgye Tae clan (Korean: 협계 태씨; Hanja: 陜溪太氏) is a Korean clan, with the bon-gwan (ancestral seat) based in Singye County, North Korea.

== Background ==
The apical ancestor of the clan is Tae Chungsang, the father of Tae Choyŏng who founded Parhae. The intermediary ancestor (Korean: 중시조; Hanja: 中始祖; MR: chung sijo) of the clan is considered to be T'ae Chipsŏng (태집성; 太集成), a general of the Goryeo military regime and a descendant of Parhae's last crown prince, Tae Kwanghyŏn. T'ae married his daughter to Ch'oe U, becoming the father-in-law of the de facto ruler of Goryeo. With the deaths of T'ae Chipsŏng and Ch'oe U, Ch'oe U's illegitimate son, Ch'oe Hang, succeeded him. The T'ae clan fell out of power due to the transition, as Lady T'ae, the wife of Ch'oe U, supported Ch'oe U's grandson, Kim Mi (김미; 金敉), not Ch'oe Hang, as the one to succeed her husband. With their fall from power, the T'ae clan moved out from the royal capital of Kaegyŏng.

The 2000 South Korean census recorded the population of the clan as 1,348 members, belonging to 437 households.

== See also ==
- Tae (Korean surname)
