= Tae =

Tae may refer to:

== People ==
=== Surnames ===
- Dae (surname), romanized as Tae in McCune–Reischauer, a Korean surname (대)
- Tae (Korean surname), a Korean surname (태)
- Tae (Korean given name)

=== Individuals ===
==== Japan ====
- Tae Ashida (芦田 多恵; born 1964), Japanese fashion designer
- Tae Hitoto (一青 妙; born 1970), Japanese-Taiwanese actress
- Tae Honma (本間 多恵; born 1985), Japanese professional wrestler
- Tae Ito (1903 - 2017), Japanese supercentenarian
- Tae Kimura (木村 多江; born 1971), Japanese actress
- Tae Satoya (里谷 多英; born 1976), Japanese freestyle skier
- Tae Okajima (岡嶋 妙), Japanese voice actress

==== Thailand ====
- TAE (actor), Thai actor in the Chinese-language MAMA MO BLUE

==== United States ====
- Tae Brooks, (born 1997) American recording artist, singer, songwriter and actor
- Tae Crowder, (born 1997) American football linebacker
- Tae Davis, (born 1996) American football linebacker
- Tae Hayes, (born 1997) American football cornerback
- Tae Johnson (government official), American law enforcement official
- Tae Keller, American children's book author
- Tae Meadows (born 2004), American football running back

== Fictional characters ==
- Tae Hanazono (花園 たえ), a fictional character in the musical anime and media franchise BanG Dream!

== Transportation ==
- Daegu International Airport (IATA: TAE), South Korea
- Τεχνικαί Αεροπορικαί Εκμεταλλεύσεις (Technical and Aeronautical Holdings), a former Greek airline
- Trabajos Aéreos y Enlaces, a Spanish airline that operated from 1967 to 1981

== Other ==
- Tae (Tanzania), a ward in the district Same in Tanzania
- TAE buffer, a solution used in chemistry
- TAE connector, for German telephone equipment
- Tae' language, an Austronesian language spoken in Sulawesi, Indonesia
- TAE Technologies, an American nuclear fusion company
- Tae, Uthumphon Phisai, a tambon (local government unit) of Uthumphon Phisai district, northeastern Thailand
- Tariana language (ISO 639-3: tae), a Maipurean language spoken in Amazonas, Brazil
- Technicien aéronautique d'exploitation (Aeronautical operations technician), a French occupational certification
- Tomás Alva Edison School, Mexico City
- Transportable Applications Environment, a 1980s GUI development environment
