= Tae Tosu =

Korean military official (fl. 10th–11th centuries)

- Hangul: 대도수
- Hanja: 大道秀
- RR: Dae Dosu
- MR: Tae Tosu

Tae Tosu (Korean: 대도수; Hanja: 大道秀) was a Goryeo military official who served in the Goryeo-Khitan Wars. He was a scion of the royal family of Balhae, some who had fled to Goryeo after its fall to the Khitans.

== Biography ==
Tae Tosu was either the son or grandson of Tae Kwanghyŏn, the crown prince of Balhae who fled to Goryeo. The genealogies of the Hyŏpkye T'ae clan (협계 태씨; 陜溪太氏), the Yŏngsun T'ae clan (영순 태씨; 永順太氏), and the Miryang Tae clan all claim that he was the son of Tae Kwanghyŏn. He had a son named Tae Hyŏng-in (대형인; 大亨仁), and a grandson named Tae Hong-yun (대홍윤; 大洪允).

During the First Goryeo-Khitan War, Tae served as a senior colonel (Korean: 중랑장; Hanja: 中郎將; MR: chungnangjang), defending at the Battle of Anyung-jin (안융진; 安戎鎭). Alongside junior colonel Yu Pang, the Goryeo army was able to emerge victorious at Anyung-jin, defeating Liao general Xiao Hengde. By the time of the Second Goryeo-Khitan War, Tae became a general. In 1010, he was defending Sŏgyŏng from the Liao. Tae planned an attack on the nearby Liao troops with fellow Goryeo commander T'ak Sajŏng. However, when the time came, T'ak did not send his troops, causing Tae's loss and capture by the Khitans.

== In popular culture ==
- Portrayed by Choi Dong-joon in the 2009 KBS2 TV series Empress Cheonchu. In the show, Tae was depicted as being a sub-ordinate of Empress Cheonchu during the Battle of Anyung-jin rather than its main commander. Empress Cheonchu historically was also not involved in fighting the Battle of Anyung-jin.
