= Battle of Kuju =

Battle in Korea in 1019

Battle of Kwiju
- Part of Third Goryeo-Khitan War
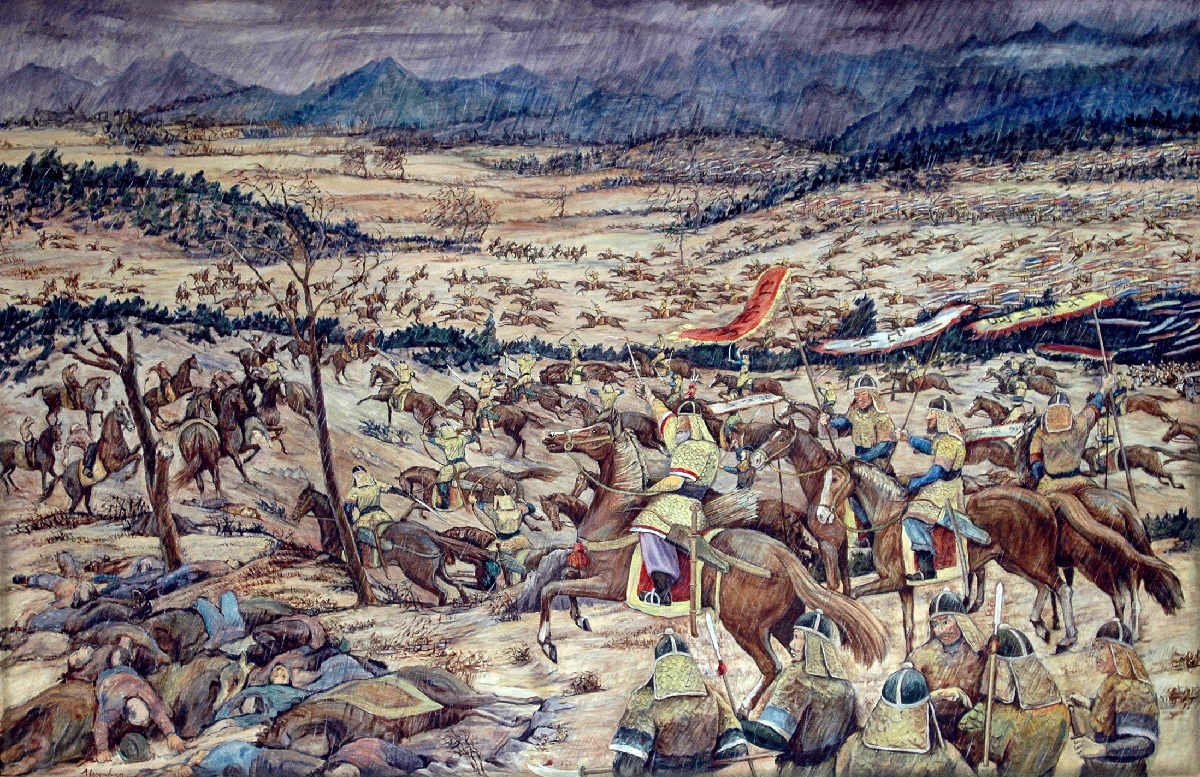
- Battle of Kwiju
| Date | 10 March 1019 |
| Location | Kuju (present-day Kusong), North Pyongan |
| Result | Goryeo victory |

Belligerents
| Liao dynasty | Goryeo |

Commanders and leaders
| Xiao Paiya | Kang Kam-ch'an; Kang Min-ch'ŏm; Kim Chong-hyŏn |

Strength
| 100,000 | 208,300 |

Casualties and losses
| 90,000+ | Few thousand |

Battle of Kuju
- Traditional Chinese: 龜州大捷
- Simplified Chinese: 龟州大捷
Transcriptions
Standard Mandarin
- Hanyu Pinyin: Guīzhōu dàjié

- Battle of Kuju
- Hangul: 귀주 대첩
- Hanja: 龜州大捷
- RR: Gwiju daecheop
- MR: Kwiju taech'ŏp

The Battle of Kwiju, also known as the Battle of Kuju, which occurred in 1019, was the major battle during the Third Goryeo–Khitan War (1018-1019), fought between the Khitan-led Liao dynasty of China and the Goryeo dynasty of Korea.

After crossing the Amnok River, the Liao dynasty troops invaded the Goryeo dynasty. The Goryeo general Kang Kam-ch'an dammed a stream and released it as the Liao troops were crossing. Despite suffering significant casualties, Liao troops marched to Gaegyeong, the capital of Goryeo.

During their campaign, general Kang Kam-ch'an cut the supplies of the Liao troops and harassed them relentlessly. Exhausted, the Liao troops decided to retreat hastily northward. Monitoring the movement of their troops, general Kang Kamch'an attacked them in the vicinity of Gwiju, ending in a complete victory for the Goryeo dynasty. The battle is considered one of the greatest victories in Korean military history.

== Aftermath ==
After the battle, peace negotiations followed and the Liao dynasty did not invade Korea again. Korea agreed to break off relations with the Song and have tributary relations with the Liao, but kept its newly gained territories at the Yalu river. According to historian Bielenstein however, Goryeo maintained diplomatic relations with Song rather than break relations, Hyeonjong kept his own reign title, and the Goryeo and Liao had concluded peace as equals in 1022. After the conflict's end, Korea entered in a long and peaceful period with its foreign neighbours across the Yalu River.

== See also ==
- Goryeo-Khitan Wars
- First Goryeo-Khitan War
- Second Goryeo-Khitan War
- Third Goryeo-Khitan War
- Kang Kamch'an
- Siege of Kusong

== Sources ==
- Rossabi, Morris (1983-05-20). China Among Equals: The Middle Kingdom and Its Neighbors, 10th-14th Centuries. University of California Press. p. 323. ISBN 9780520045620.
- Bielenstein, Hans (2005), Diplomacy and Trade in the Chinese World, 589–1276, BRILL, ISBN 978-90-474-0761-4
