= Xingliao =

1029–1030 state in Manchuria

Xingliao 興遼國 흥요국
- 1029–1030
- Capital: Liaoyang
- Government: Monarchy
- Emperor
  - 1029 – 1030: Da Yanlin (Dae Yeon-rim)
- History
  - Establishment: 1029
  - Fall: 1030
- Today part of: China

Chinese name
- Traditional Chinese: 興遼
- Simplified Chinese: 兴辽
Transcriptions
Standard Mandarin
- Hanyu Pinyin: Xìngliáo

Korean name
- Hangul: 흥요
- Hanja: 興遼
Transcriptions
- Revised Romanization: Heungyo
- McCune–Reischauer: Hŭngyo

Xingliao or Heungyo (Chinese: 興遼國; Korean: 흥요국; 1029–1030) was a state founded by Da Yanlin (Dae Yeon-rim), a Liao dynasty rebel, who was the 7th-generation descendant of Dae Joyeong, the founder of Parhae (Bohai).

== History ==
In the summer of 1029, Da Yanlin rebelled at the Eastern Capital (Liaoyang), where he had served as a general. He imprisoned minister Xiao Xiaoxian and his wife, and killed the tax commissioners and chief military commander.

Da declared himself the Tianxing Emperor (天興皇帝) of his own Xingliao dynasty (興遼國/흥료국 and proclaimed the era name "Tianqing" (天慶).

Da sent an ambassador requesting military support from Goryeo. Goryeo sent some troops against the Liao but the Khitans repelled them and expelled the Goryeo army. Further ambassadors were sent by Xingliao to Goryeo seeking aid but Goryeo refused to help them owing to the advice of nobles and scholars to the Goryeo king. Four groups of ambassadors were sent but the last group, led by Lee Kwang Rok, remained in Goryeo rather than return. Historian Alexander Kim considers this group to be refugees rather than an ambassadorial mission. Many participants of the rebellion probably realized the weakness of the new dynasty and fled to Goryeo before its collapse. Other Parhae people serving in the Liao military also refused to join Xingliao. Instead only a handful of Jurchens joined Da's regime.

In 1030, Xingliao and its Jurchen and Goryeo allies were defeated by a Liao pincer attack led by Punu. One of Da Yanlin's officers, Yang Xiangshi, betrayed him and opened the Eastern Capital's gates to the Khitans. His short lived dynasty came to an end. The old Parhae nobility were resettled near the Supreme Capital while others fled to Goryeo.

== See also ==
- Parhae
- Later Parhae
- Jeongan
