= James A. Gardner =

Medal of Honor winner (1943–1966)

James Alton Gardner
- Born: February 7, 1943; Dyersburg, Tennessee, U.S.
- Died: February 7, 1966 (aged 23); My Canh, Vietnam
- Burial place: Fairview Cemetery, Dyersburg, Tennessee
- Military career
- Allegiance: United States of America
- Branch: United States Army
- Service years: 1964–1966
- Rank: First Lieutenant
- Units: Headquarters and Headquarters Company, 1st Battalion, 327th Infantry, 1st Brigade, 101st Airborne Division
- Conflicts: Vietnam War †
- Awards: Medal of Honor; Bronze Star; Purple Heart; Vietnam Gallantry Cross with Palm

James Alton Gardner (February 7, 1943 – February 7, 1966) was a United States Army officer and a recipient of the United States military's highest decoration, the Medal of Honor, for his actions in the Vietnam War.

== Biography ==
Gardner was born and raised in Dyersburg, Tennessee, the son of mother Johnnye Patterson. He attended Holice Powell School before graduating from Dyersburg High School.

Gardner attended the United States Military Academy, but left prior to completing his freshman "plebe" year.

Gardner joined the Army from Memphis, Tennessee in 1964, and after completing Officer Candidate School, was stationed with the 101st Airborne Division at Fort Campbell, Kentucky. He married Joella McManus in June 1965, a month before being sent to Vietnam.

Later that year, after arriving in Vietnam, he helped to form and train Tiger Force, a task force of the division's 1st Battalion (Airborne), 327th Infantry Regiment, 1st Brigade, which specialized in the use of guerrilla tactics. On February 7, 1966, during Operation Van Buren, Gardner, then a first lieutenant in his brigade's Headquarters and Headquarters Company, led a platoon in the relief of a company that was pinned down by a strongly entrenched and numerically superior enemy force at the village of My Canh. During the assault on the enemy positions, he single-handedly attacked four bunkers. He was mortally wounded while approaching a fifth bunker, but managed to destroy it before succumbing to his injuries. For these actions, he was posthumously awarded the Medal of Honor. He was killed on his 23rd birthday, one month before his tour in Vietnam was to end.

He was buried on February 15, 1966, at Fairview Cemetery in his hometown of Dyersburg. In addition to the Medal of Honor, Gardner also received the Vietnam Gallantry Cross with Palm, the Bronze Star, and the Purple Heart.

During a ceremony at the Pentagon on October 19, 1967, Gardner's widow was formally presented with his Medal of Honor by Secretary of the Army Stanley Rogers Resor. The medal passed between Gardner's widow, mother, and sister until 2009, when it was donated to the 101st Airborne Division. On August 14, 2009, his sister, Lynda Gardner-Park, gave the Medal of Honor to his former unit to be displayed in the division's headquarters at Fort Campbell.

The Army National Guard armory in Dyersburg is named in Gardner's honor.

== Death and Medal of Honor citation ==
First Lieutenant Gardner's official Medal of Honor citation reads:

For conspicuous gallantry and intrepidity in action at the risk of his life above and beyond the call of duty. 1st Lt. Gardner's platoon was advancing to relieve a company of the 1st Battalion that had been pinned down for several hours by a numerically superior enemy force in the village of My Canh, Vietnam. The enemy occupied a series of strongly fortified bunker positions which were mutually supporting and expertly concealed. Approaches to the position were well covered by an integrated pattern of fire including automatic weapons, machine guns and mortars. Air strikes and artillery placed on the fortifications had little effect. 1st Lt. Gardner's platoon was to relieve the friendly company by encircling and destroying the enemy force. Even as it moved to begin the attack, the platoon was under heavy enemy fire. During the attack, the enemy fire intensified. Leading the assault and disregarding his own safety, 1st Lt. Gardner charged through a withering hail of fire across an open rice paddy. On reaching the first bunker he destroyed it with a grenade and without hesitation dashed to the second bunker and eliminated it by tossing a grenade inside. Then, crawling swiftly along the dike of a rice paddy, he reached the third bunker. Before he could arm a grenade, the enemy gunner leaped forth, firing at him. 1st Lt. Gardner instantly returned the fire and killed the enemy gunner at a distance of 6 feet. Following the seizure of the main enemy position, he reorganized the platoon to continue the attack. Advancing to the new assault position, the platoon was pinned down by an enemy machine gun emplaced in a fortified bunker. 1st Lt. Gardner immediately collected several grenades and charged the enemy position, firing his rifle as he advanced to neutralize the defenders. He dropped a grenade into the bunker and vaulted beyond. As the bunker blew up, he came under fire again. Rolling into a ditch to gain cover, he moved toward the new source of fire. Nearing the position, he leaped from the ditch and advanced with a grenade in one hand and firing his rifle with the other. He was gravely wounded just before he reached the bunker, but with a last valiant effort he staggered forward and destroyed the bunker, and its defenders with a grenade. Although he fell dead on the rim of the bunker, his extraordinary actions so inspired the men of his platoon that they resumed the attack and completely routed the enemy. 1st Lt. Gardner's conspicuous gallantry were in the highest traditions of the U.S. Army.

== See also ==
- List of Medal of Honor recipients for the Vietnam War
