= Miryang Dae clan =

Korean clan

Miryang Dae clan Miryang Tae clan
- Country: North and South Korea
- Current region: Miryang
- Founder: Dae Jung-sang

The Miryang Dae clan (Korean: 밀양 대씨; Hanja: 密陽大氏) is a Korean clan. The founder is Dae Jung-sang.

== History ==
The founder of the Miryang Dae clan is Dae Jung-sang. In 698, his son Dae Jo-yeong founded the kingdom of Balhae. When Balhae fell to the Liao dynasty, a son of Balhae's last king Dae Inseon, Dae T'ak (대탁; 大鐸) led a group of refugees to Goryeo and settled down in Miryang, beginning the founding of the Miryang Dae clan.

The first ancestor recorded in the genealogy was Dae T'ak (대탁; 大鐸), who served as the Minister of Personnel. His son was Dae Tŏk-se (대덕세; 大德歲) who held a government office during the Joseon dynasty and for his service to the country, was enfeoffed as the Lord of Miryang (밀양군; 密陽君). His son Dae Mun-gi (대문기; 大文記) served as the Chief Magistrate of Hanseong (한성판윤; 漢成判尹). Other prominent members of this clan were: Dae Chung-t'aek (대중택; 大重澤) who served as ch'ŏm-chijungch'ubusa (첨지중추부사; 僉知中樞府事) and Dae Kuk-ŏn (대국언; 大國彦), who served as the Minister of Revenue (호조판서; 戶曹判書).

According to the 1985 South Korean census, there were 499 members of the Miryang Dae clan, from 115 households. According to the 2000 South Korean census, the population decreased to 492 members, while the number of households increased to 162.

== See also ==
- Dae (surname)
