= Later Parhae =

Former state

Later Parhae 後渤海 후발해
- 928–935
- Capital: Holhan
- Common languages: Parhae language
- Religion: Parhae Buddhism, Parhae Confucianism, Parhae Taoism, Parhae shamanism
- Government: Monarchy
- History
  - Establishment: 928
  - Fall: 935
Preceded by	Succeeded by
Parhae	Chŏngan
- Today part of: China; North Korea

Later Parhae

Chinese name
- Chinese: 后渤海
Transcriptions
Standard Mandarin
- Hanyu Pinyin: Hòu bó hǎi
- Wade–Giles: Hu Bohai

Korean name
- Hangul: 후발해
- Hanja: 後渤海
Transcriptions
- Revised Romanization: Hubalhae
- McCune–Reischauer: Hubarhae

Later Parhae or Later Bohai (928–935) was a state hypothesized to have existed in Manchuria. It emerged after Parhae (Bohai) was destroyed by the Liao dynasty. Later Parhae is considered by some to be the first of several successor states to Parhae after its fall to the Liao dynasty in 926.

The existence of Later Parhae was first proposed by Japanese scholar Hino Kaizaburo in 1943 and subsequently supported by some South Korean scholars. Outside of South Korea, "Later Parhae" is usually understood as a name for the kingdom of Dongdan or other polities on the former territory of Parhae.

== History ==
In 926, Parhae was annexed by the Khitan-led Liao dynasty, incorporated into the Liao vassal Dongdan Kingdom. The conquered people of Parhae immediately began rebelling against the Liao dynasty. Starting in 927, the Khitans had begun to hunt down and execute all members of the royal family in order to destroy any chance of a new ruler to take the throne. However, several members of the royal family survived. Among them were Crown Prince Dae Gwang-hyeon. The Crown Prince took Parhae refugees, mostly former Goguryeo people, and escaped down to their southern neighbor, Goryeo, where the newly-risen King Taejo of Goryeo accepted them with generosity.

In 928, the Liao dynasty moved the Dongdan capital to Liaoyang and relocated the Parhae remnants. As Dongdan retreated, the Dae clan then united the western Amnok River resistance groups and established Later Parhae at the old capital Holhan. Later, general Yeol Manhwa took control in a coup and established Chŏngan (Ding'an) in 935.

== See also ==
- Parhae
- Jeongan
- Heungyo
