= Tae Insŏn =

Last King of Balhae (r. 906–926)

Dae In-seon

Birth name in Chinese
- Chinese: 大諲譔
Transcriptions
Standard Mandarin
- Hanyu Pinyin: Dà Yīnzhuàn
- Wade–Giles: Ta Yinchuan

Birth name in Korean
- Hangul: 대인선
- Hanja: 大諲譔
Transcriptions
- Revised Romanization: Dae Inseon
- McCune–Reischauer: Tae Insŏn

Tae Insŏn (Korean: 대인선; Hanja: 大諲譔; r. 906–926) was the last king of Balhae, a kingdom in northeast Asia occupying parts of Manchuria, northern Korea, and the Russian Far East. He and his armies were pushed back and eventually defeated by the Khitan.

== Last years of Balhae ==
This was a time of momentous change for Balhae and its neighbors. In the case of Silla, the nobility increasingly became independent and rebellions sprang up throughout the country. Meanwhile, in China, the Tang faced serious crises caused by the Jiedushi after the An lushan rebellion and many other uprisings. Finally, Zhu Wen established the Later Liang, marking the end of the Tang dynasty in 907.

Tae concentrated on increasing defense capabilities against the threat of new powers and was in favor of allying with the Goryeo dynasty. However, the interference of the nobility did not allow that to happen. The Khitans' growing power in Manchuria was the most threatening to Balhae. Eventually, they invaded Balhae in 925 and the capital Sanggyeong (also known as Holhan fortress) fell after ten days. In 926, Balhae came to an end, some of the nobles were moved to the Khitan proper by the Liao dynasty, while many of its populace including many of the nobility fled to Goryeo.

== Aftermath ==
The Khitans established the Dongdan Kingdom on the former territories of Balhae, which was ruled by crown prince Yelü Bei. The Balhae royal family was allowed to share control of the former Balhae territories with Liao aristocrats because of the political chaos and lack of a strong administration following Balhae's fall. Tae Insŏn likely served in high positions during Yelü Bei's rule and possibly shared power with the latter.

Tae Insŏn's son and the last Crown Prince of Balhae, Tae Kwanghyŏn, gathered an army and continued to spearhead resistance against the Liao. Many members of the Dae Clan lead Later Balhae and refused to submit to the Liao as Tae Insŏn had. In 937, Tae Kwanghyŏn led tens of thousands of Balhae refugees and fled to Goryeo, where he was warmly received by Wang Geon, the founder of the Goryeo dynasty, which is seen by Korean historians as having brought the unification of the two successor states of Goguryeo.

== See also ==
- List of Korean monarchs
- History of Korea

Tae Insŏn House of Tae Died: 926
Regnal titles
Preceded by Tae Wihae	King of Balhae; 906–926	Succeeded by Yelü Bei as King of Dongdan
