= Tae (Korean surname) =

- Hangul: 태
- Hanja: 太
- RR: Tae
- MR: T'ae

Tae, also spelled Tai or Thae, is a rare Korean family name. It is written with a hanja character meaning "great".

== Lineage ==
As a rare Korean family name, Tae is written with only one hanja, meaning "great" (太). They are a noble lineage directly descended from the royal family of the Balhae dynasty. The clan ancestor is Dae Jung-sang, the father of the founder of Balhae, Dae Jo-young. The 2000 South Korean Census found 8,165 people with the family name Tae. In a study by the National Institute of the Korean Language based on 2007 application data for South Korean passports, it was found that 28.5% of people with that surname spelled it in Latin letters as Tai in their passports, vs. 57.1% as Tae. People with this surname trace their origins to several bon-gwan, including Namwon and Yeongsun in what is now South Korea and Hyopgye in what is now North Korea.

== Notable people ==
People with this family name include:

- T'ae Kŭm-ch'wi (fl. 1253–1260), Goryeo military commander, founder of the Yeongsun Tae clan
- Tae Wan-son (born 1915 -1988), South Korean politician and businessman who served as minister of Construction Department.
- Thae Byong-ryol (1916 - 1986), North Korean general
- Thae Jong-su (born 1936), North Korean politician
- Tae Hyun-sil (born 1941), South Korean actress
- Thae Hyong-chol (born 1953), North Korean politician
- Tae Yong-ho (born 1962), North Korean diplomat who defected to South Korea in 2016
- Tae Hang-ho (born 1983), South Korean actor
- Tae Won-seok (born 1989), South Korean actor
- Tae Yoon (born 1992), South Korean football player in India

== See also ==
- List of Korean family names
- Dae (surname)
- 太 (disambiguation)
