= Lee Bong-chool =

Republic of Korea Marine Corps officer (1925–1992)

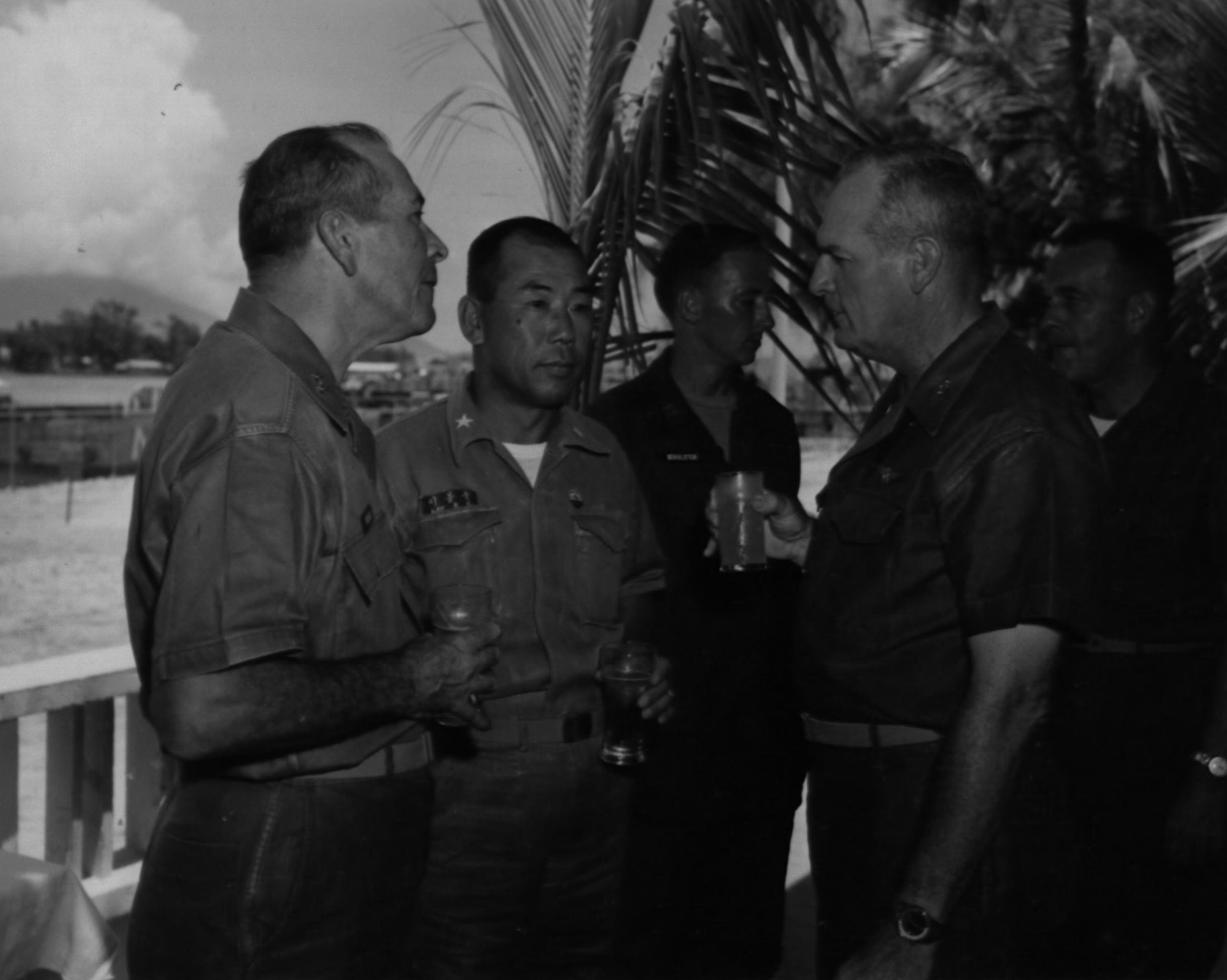
- General Yi Bong-chool visits General Lewis J. Fields, 29 August 1966
- Born: 1 January 1925; Haman County, South Gyeongsang Province
- Died: 12 January 1992 (aged 67)
- Military career
- Allegiance: South Korea
- Branch: Republic of Korea Marine Corps
- Service years: 1945–1971
- Rank: Brigadier general
- Commands: 2nd Marine Brigade
- Wars: Korean War; Vietnam War
- Awards: Eulji Order of Military Merit; Chungmu Order of Military Merit; Distinguished Service Medal

- Lee Bong-chool
- Hangul: 이봉출
- Hanja: 李鳳出
- RR: I Bongchul
- MR: I Pongch'ul

Lee Bong-chool (1925–1992) was an officer in the Republic of Korea Marine Corps.

== Early life ==
Lee Bong-chool was born on 1 January 1925 in Haman County, South Gyeongsang Province.

== Military career ==
He was commissioned as a Second lieutenant in the Republic of Korea Navy in September 1946, he transferred to the Republic of Korea Marine Corps (ROKMC) after its formation in April 1949.

At the outbreak of the Korean War Yi, then a Captain, commanded the 25th Marine Corps Company. He led that unit in defensive battles ultimately defending the westernmost area of the Pusan Perimeter. He led his unit in the Battle of Inchon and the Second Battle of Seoul. In January 1951, he commanded the Independent 9th Battalion defending the Kimpo area during the Third Battle of Seoul.

He attended the United States Marine Corps Schools at Marine Corps Base Quantico.

He commanded the 2nd Marine Brigade in South Vietnam.

In June 1971 he was appointed as deputy commandant of the ROKMC.

== Personal life ==
He was married to Ku Boo-ja and they had two children.

He died on 12 January 1992.
