= Siege of Kuju =

Siege in 1231

- Part of Mongol invasions of Korea
Date	September 1231 – January 1232
Location	Kusong, Goryeo
Result	Goryeo victory

Belligerents
Mongol Empire	Goryeo

Commanders and leaders
Saritai	Pak Seo; Kim Kyŏng-son

Strength
10,000	5,000

Casualties and losses
Unknown	Unknown

The siege of Kuju (Korean: 귀주성전투) which occurred in 1231 was a decisive Goryeo victory against the Mongol Empire during the First Mongol Invasion of Korea. After the Mongol army crossed the Yalu river, it quickly captured almost all of Goryeo's border defenses. The Mongol army, however, ran into stiff resistance both at Anju and the city of Kuju (modern-day Kusong), commanded by General Park Seo.

For thirty days, the Mongols besieged the city and attacked it hundreds of times. To take Kuju, Saritai used the full array of siege weapons to bring down the city's defenses. Lines of catapults launched both boulders and molten metals at the city's walls. The Mongols deployed special assault teams who manned siege towers and scaling ladders. Other tactics used were pushing flaming carts against the city's wooden gates and tunneling under the walls. The most grisly weapon used during the siege were fire-bombs which contained boiled down, liquefied human fat.

During the siege, an old Mongol general of over seventy years of age toured beneath the city walls to look over the city's ramparts and equipment. He sighed and said:

"I have follow[ed] the [Mongol] army since I bound my hair [into plaits as a youth] and so I am accustomed to seeing the cities of the earth attacked and fought over. Still I have never seen [a city] undergo an attack like this which did not, in the end, submit."

Despite the Goryeo army being heavily outnumbered and after over thirty days of brutal siege warfare, Goryeo soldiers still refused to surrender and with mounting Mongol casualties, the Mongol army could not take the city and had to withdraw.

== Aftermath ==
Kuju would submit to the Mongols in 1232, after multiple demands by the Goryeo court which had sued for peace with the Mongols much earlier. Pak Seo and Ch'oe Ch'unmyŏmg, defender of Chaju, were almost executed but the Mongols spared them owing to their courage, which they admired. Despite this initial peace, fighting would resume between Goryeo and the Mongol Empire in June 1232.

== See also ==
- Mongol invasions of Korea
- History of Korea
- Battle of Guju
