= Operation Hood River =

Part of the Vietnam War (1967)

- Part of the Vietnam War
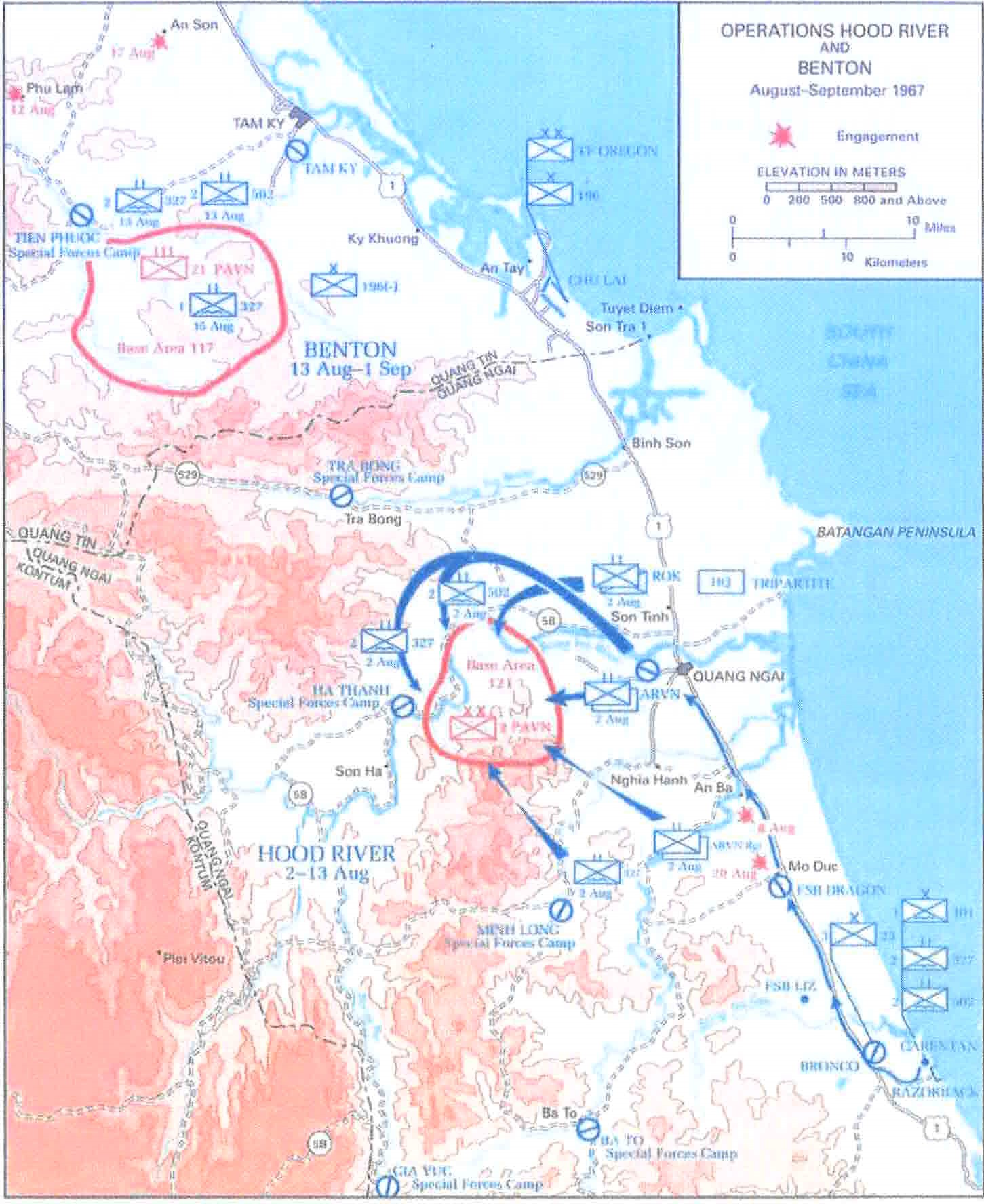
- Operations Hood River and Benton, August–September 1967
| Date | 2–13 August 1967 |
| Location | Quảng Ngãi Province, South Vietnam |
| Result | Inconclusive |

Belligerents
| United States; South Korea; South Vietnam | North Vietnam |

Commanders and leaders
| (United States) MGen Richard T. Knowles (South Korea) BG Kim Yun-sang (South Vietnam) Gen Nguyễn Văn Toàn | |

Units involved
| (United States) 2nd Battalion, 327th Infantry Regiment (United States) 2nd Battalion, 502nd Infantry Regiment (United States) 196th Infantry Brigade (South Korea) 2nd Marine Brigade (South Vietnam) 2 Ranger Battalions (South Vietnam) Airborne Battalion | 1st Regiment; 21st Regiment |

Casualties and losses
| (United States) 21 killed | US body count: 166 killed |

Operation Hood River was a joint U.S., South Korean and South Vietnamese operation conducted in Quảng Ngãi Province, lasting from 2 to 13 August 1967.

== Background ==
In late July the Army of the Republic of Vietnam (ARVN) II Corps received intelligence that the People's Army of Vietnam (PAVN) 1st Regiment was regrouping in Base Area 121, 20 km west of Quảng Ngãi and would soon be joined by the 21st Regiment in preparation for an attack on Quảng Ngai before the Presidential election on 3 September.

The new Task Force Oregon commander, MGen Richard T. Knowles planned for the 2nd Battalion, 327th Infantry Regiment and the 2nd Battalion, 502nd Infantry Regiment to be deployed by helicopter to the west of Base Area 121, the South Korean 2nd Marine Brigade would move in from the north and two ARVN Ranger Battalions would move in from the south backed up by an ARVN Airborne Battalion operating from the Minh Long Special Force Camp. A mechanized task force of the 196th Infantry Brigade would patrol Route 529. Surprise would be essential to the plan.

== Operation ==
The operation commenced on 2 August with the forces reaching their initial objectives by nightfall. The Allied forces engaged small groups of PAVN but were unable to locate either of the PAVN Regiments which were supposed to be in the area. Meanwhile, PAVN attacks increased in the areas vacated by the Allied forces.

== Aftermath ==
Operation Hood River officially concluded on 13 August, PAVN losses were 166 killed, Allied losses were 21 killed. The operation was a disappointment and it was speculated that the PAVN had been tipped off by spies within the ARVN staff or that the original intelligence was misinformation.
