= Tae Kŭmch'wi =

13th-century Goryeo military commander

- Hangul: 대금취
- Hanja: 大金就
- RR: Dae Geumchwi
- MR: Tae Kŭmch'wi

Alternate name
- Hangul: 태금취
- Hanja: 太金就
- RR: Tae Geumchwi
- MR: T'ae Kŭmch'wi

Tae Kŭmch'wi (Korean: 대금취; Hanja: 大金就; fl. 1253–1260), also known as T'ae Kŭmch'wi, was a Goryeo military official during the Mongol invasions of Korea. A descendant of Balhae crown prince Tae Kwanghyŏn, Tae Kŭmch'wi was given the fief of Yeongsun (now modern-day Mungyeong) and became the intermediary ancestor of the Yeongsun Tae clan.

== Biography ==
On September 1, 1253, (Note: In the Korean calendar (lunisolar), the 7th day of the 8th Lunar month.) lieutenant (교위; 校尉; kyowi) Tae Kŭmch'wi took 30 men of the Ubong Special Unit and defeated a Mongol force between Kŭmgyo (금교; 金郊) and Hŭngŭi (흥의; 興義). By 1260, he had reached the rank of subcolonel (별장; 別將; pyŏlchang). On January 25, 1260, (Note: In the Korean calendar (lunisolar), the 12th day of the 12th Lunar month of 1259.) Tae defeated another Mongol force near Kaesong, rescuing prisoners that had been taken captive by the Mongols. Due to his achievements, Tae Kŭmch'wi was given Yeongsun as a fief. Yeongsun was originally a village called Imha, but it was upgraded to the status of county and renamed to Yeongsun in recognition of Tae's achievements.
