= Battle of Trà Bình =

Part of the Vietnam War (1967)

- Part of the Vietnam War
Date	February 14–15, 1967
Location	Trà Bình village, Trà Bồng District, Quảng Ngãi, South Vietnam
Result	South Korean victory

Belligerents
North Vietnam (Provisional Revolutionary Government of the Republic of South Vietnam) Viet Cong	South Korea; South Vietnam; United States

Commanders and leaders
(Provisional Revolutionary Government of the Republic of South Vietnam) Hà Văn Trí; Nguyễn Chơn	(Third Republic of Korea) Jeong Kyung-Jin

Units involved
40th and 60th Battalions, 1st Ba Gia Regiment, 2nd Infantry Division	11th Company, 3rd Battalion, 2nd Marine Brigade Sub-Unit One, 1st Air Naval Gunfire Liaison Company

Strength
(North Vietnam) 240+ (Provisional Revolutionary Government of the Republic of South Vietnam) 600	294

Casualties and losses
South Korea claim: 246 killed 30 weapons recovered PAVN claim: Heavy/No specific number	South Korea claim: 15 killed PAVN claim: 420 casualties

The Battle of Trà Bình (Vietnamese: Trận Quang Thạnh; Korean: 짜빈동 전투) was fought in the Trà Bình village, Trà Bồng District, on February 14–15, 1967 during the Vietnam War. The 11th Company, 3rd Battalion, 2nd Marine Brigade defeated a regimental-sized attack in four hours of close quarters combat. The People's Army of Vietnam (PAVN) and Viet Cong (VC) penetrated the company's perimeter on two occasions. The 11th Company Marines fought using every weapon available; much of the fighting was hand-to-hand. Two U.S. Marines assigned to Sub Unit One, 1st Air Naval Gunfire Liaison Company (ANGLICO), Lance Corporals Jim Porta and Dave Long, were instrumental to the company's success, killing enemy infiltrators, coordinating air support, joining a counterattack to restore the perimeter and aiding the wounded.

The battle took place after a VC defector, a former commander of a training camp, revealed that the PAVN was planning an attack on the ROKMC's 11th Company. On February 14, the PAVN 40th and 60th Battalions moved into their positions in the forest surrounding the perimeter of the ROKMC 11th Company. The regular PAVN battalions were also supported by one VC local force battalion from Quang Ngai. With their troops built up around the area, the PAVN/VC forces planned to cut all communication lines and wipe out the South Korean forces in the area.

== Battle ==
At dawn on February 15, the battle began with the VC attempting to cut through the wires of the South Korean base. The ROKMC were dug in and waiting with requests for air-support. Due to foggy weather, the supporting AC-47s could not engage the VC, so the South Koreans only had artillery support. When the PAVN/VC had penetrated Korean positions, heavy fighting followed. The South Koreans were being attacked from all sides. The South Koreans fought back against the VC soldiers with every weapon they had. They fired mortar shells at point blank range. The Koreans began to charge at the VC with their bayonets. Initially, the outnumbered South Koreans, though vastly superior in firepower, were pinned down, but the ranks of the PAVN/VC forces soon started to break up as the South Koreans counterattacked.

== Aftermath ==
When the fighting ended, South Koreans claimed that 246 PAVN/VC were killed. In addition, they reported retrieving three flamethrowers, five anti-tank rocket launchers, two machine guns, 29 rifles, 100 pieces of dynamite, and over 6,000 rounds of ammunition. ROK forces claim victory for having defended the base and preventing its capture. In the morning following the battle, the III MAF Commander visited the scene of the fighting, followed by the Commanders of I Corps, Military Assistance Command, Vietnam, the ROK Minister of National Defense and the South Korean Prime Minister. The South Korean Government awarded more decorations for the battle than any other action during the Vietnam War, including the first unit-wide promotion of enlisted Marines since the Korean War. Captain Jeong Kyung-jin and Second Lieutenant Shin Won-bae each received the Taeguk Medal, the only instance in which Korea's highest honor was awarded to two individuals.

The New York Times reported the battle as the "South Koreans' greatest victory in their 15 months in South Vietnam." Following a briefing to foreign journalists, the phrase "Legend Makers (신화를 남긴 해병대)" began to appear in the press, continuing the legacy of the "Ghost Killers (귀신 잡는 해병대)" and "Invincible Marines(무적해병)" of the Korean War."

== See also ==
- Military history of South Korea during the Vietnam War

Lightning from the Sky, Thunder from the Sea-Author House Publishing, 2009 - Thomas Petri
