= Da Yanlin =

Founder of Xingliao (fl. 11th century)

Da Yanlin (Chinese: 大延琳) or Tae Yŏllim (Korean: 대연림) was a rebel in the Liao dynasty and the founder of the Xingliao state.

== Biography ==
Da Yanlin was a descendant of the Parhae royal family as the 7th-generation direct descendant of Dae Jo-yeong, who was the founder of Parhae. He entered the Liao army at an unknown age and was eventually assigned to the Eastern Capital, Liaoyang, as a general.

While serving as a general of the Liao dynasty, Da Yanlin gathered people of Parhae origin, and eventually established the state Xingliao in the year 1029 AD. Da Yanlin declared himself the Tianxing Emperor (天興皇帝), and proclaimed the era name "Tianqing" (天慶).

Xingliao allied itself with Jurchens and Goryeo, but was conquered in 1030 AD when the Liao dynasty sent an army to conquer and destroy the state. Xingliao and its Jurchen and Goryeo allies were defeated by a pincer attack led by Punu.

== See also ==
- Parhae
- Tae Choyŏng
