= Operation Van Buren =

Part of the Vietnam War (1966)

- Part of the Vietnam War
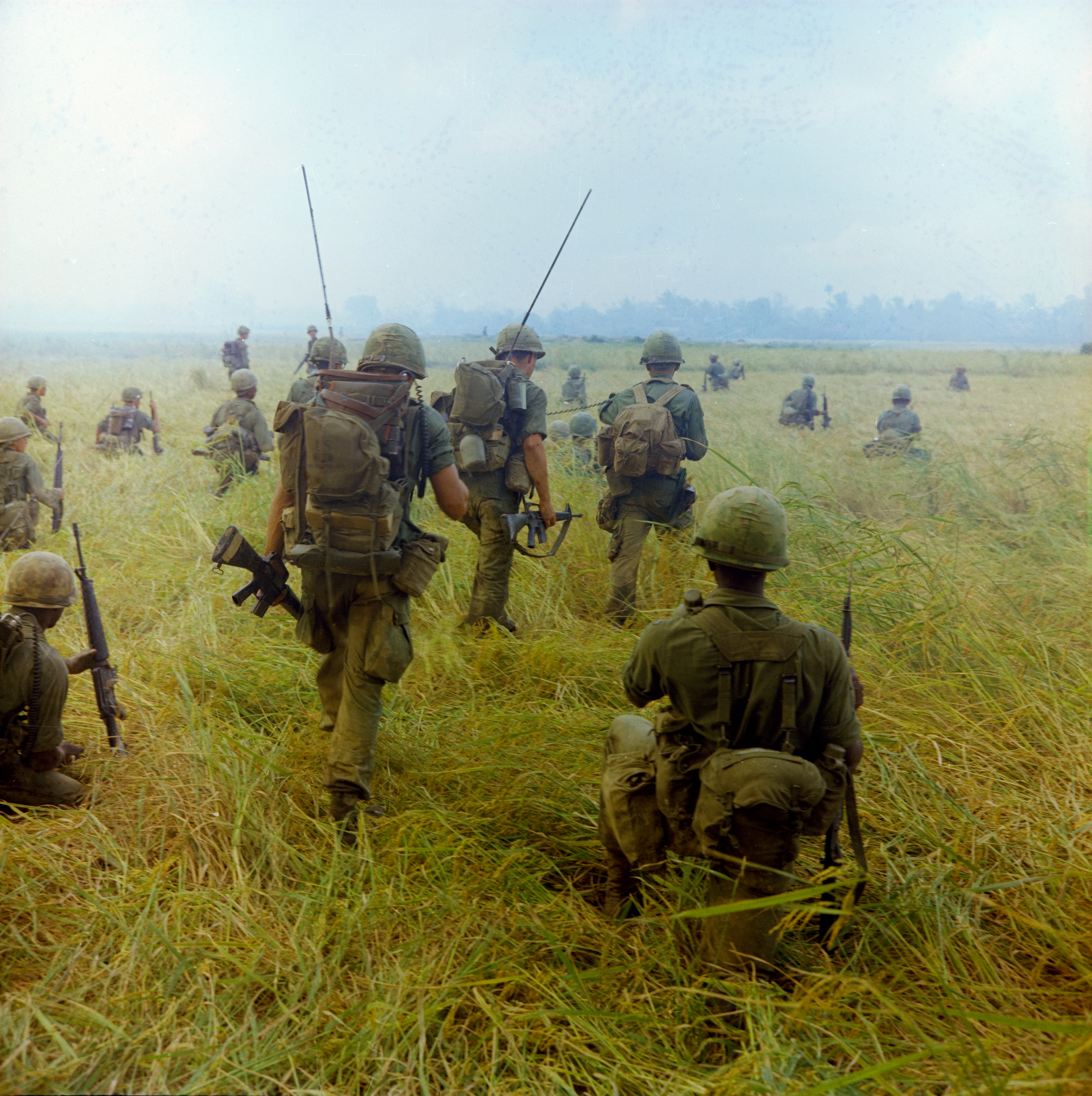
- 2/327th soldiers advancing through a field, 23 January
Date	15 January – 25 February 1966
Location	Tuy Hòa Valley, Phú Yên Province, South Vietnam 13.1°N 109.182°E
Result	U.S. operational success

Belligerents
United States; South Korea	North Vietnam

Commanders and leaders
(United States) Brig. Willard Pearson (United States) Col. James S. Timothy (United States) Maj. David Hackworth	

Units involved
(United States) 1st Brigade, 101st Airborne Division (South Korea) 2nd Marine Brigade	95th Regiment, 5th Division

Casualties and losses
(United States) 55 killed (South Korea) 45 killed	346 killed 33 captured

Operation Van Buren was a harvest security operation conducted by the 1st Brigade, 101st Airborne Division in the Tuy Hòa Valley, Phú Yên Province, lasting from 15 January to 25 February 1966.

== Prelude ==
The Tuy Hòa Valley was an important rice-growing region and in 1965 People's Army of Vietnam (PAVN) and Viet Cong forces had requisitioned much of the harvest to feed their troops. Military Assistance Command, Vietnam wanted to ensure the same would not occur again with the 1966 harvest. The PAVN 95th Regiment, 5th Division, was believed to be located in the mountains around the Tuy Hòa Valley.

== Operation ==
On 15 January, 2nd Battalion, 502nd Infantry Regiment, was flown into Tuy Hòa Airfield. On 18 January, 2nd Battalion, 327th Infantry Regiment, was landed by LST at Tuy Hòa Port. The 2/502nd proceeded to patrol north of the Đà Rằng River while the 2/327th and the South Korean 2nd Marine Brigade patrolled south of the Đà Rằng. On 31 January, the South Koreans were attacked by the PAVN, suffering heavy losses and they were withdrawn and replaced by the 1/327th.

On 6 February, a platoon from Company B, 2/502nd, came under fire as it approached the hamlet of Canh Tanh 4 (13.049°N 109.333°E), approximately 20 kilometres (12 mi) southwest of Tuy Hòa. The company commander sent platoons to the south and west of the hamlet to try to encircle the enemy forces. Once in position the U.S. forces attacked but were met by heavy fire and withdrew to allow a total of 13 airstrikes on the position. The U.S. forces tightened their cordon overnight for a renewed assault in the morning; however, they found that the enemy had abandoned the position overnight leaving behind 39 bodies and documents identifying them as members of the 5th Battalion, 95th Regiment.

On 7 February, Company C 2/502nd approached the hamlet of My Canh 2 (12.920°N 109.239°E), 2 kilometres (1.2 mi) south of Canh Tanh 4 and came under heavy fire from entrenched forces, pinning down the company. Air and artillery strikes were called in and reinforcements from Company B and Tiger Force of 1/327th commanded by Major David Hackworth were landed by helicopter nearby. Hackworth sent Tiger Force to the north of My Canh 2 and Company B to the south; Tiger Force would then launch a hammer and anvil attack. As Tiger Force moved to its attacking position the cover thinned out and they were hit by PAVN fire with seven killed. Hackworth then ordered Company B to attack and they were similarly caught in the open losing 19 killed, then withdrew into night defensive positions. Tiger Force was ordered to renew the attack and the unit commander, Lieutenant James A. Gardner, personally destroyed four machine gun positions with grenades before being killed; he was posthumously awarded the Medal of Honor for his actions. Tiger Force then moved under cover of artillery fire to join up with Company B 1/327th. The following morning after air and artillery strikes U.S. forces entered My Canh 2, the PAVN had abandoned the position overnight leaving 63 bodies and 60 weapons.

The operation continued without any other major engagements with the PAVN.

== Aftermath ==
Operation Van Buren officially concluded on 25 February; alleged PAVN losses were 346 killed and 33 captured, U.S. losses were 55 killed, South Korean losses were 45 killed.
