= Futoshi =

- Gender: Male

Origin
- Origin: Japanese
- Meaning: Different meanings depending on the kanji used

Futoshi (written: 太 or 太志) is a masculine Japanese given name. Notable people with the name include:

- Kokkai Futoshi (黒海 太; born 1981), Georgian sumo wrestler
- Futoshi Ikeda (池田 太; born 1970), Japanese footballer
- Futoshi Matsunaga (松永 太; born 1961), Japanese serial killer
- Futoshi Miyagi (ミヤギ フトシ; born 1981), Okinawan artist and writer
- Futoshi Mori (森 太志; born 1988), Japanese rugby union player
- Futoshi Nakanishi (中西 太; born 1933), Japanese baseball player and coach
- Futoshi Nishiya (西屋 太志; 1981 or 1982 – 2019), Japanese animator, director and character designer
- Futoshi Shinohara (篠原 太; born 1962), Japanese male former long-distance runner
- Futoshi Uehara (上原 太; born 1980), Japanese musician
- Futoshi Yamabe (山部 太; born 1971), Japanese former Nippon Professional Baseball pitcher
