= Tuy Hòa Base Camp =

Tuy Hòa Base Camp
- Tuy Hòa, Phú Yên Province in Vietnam
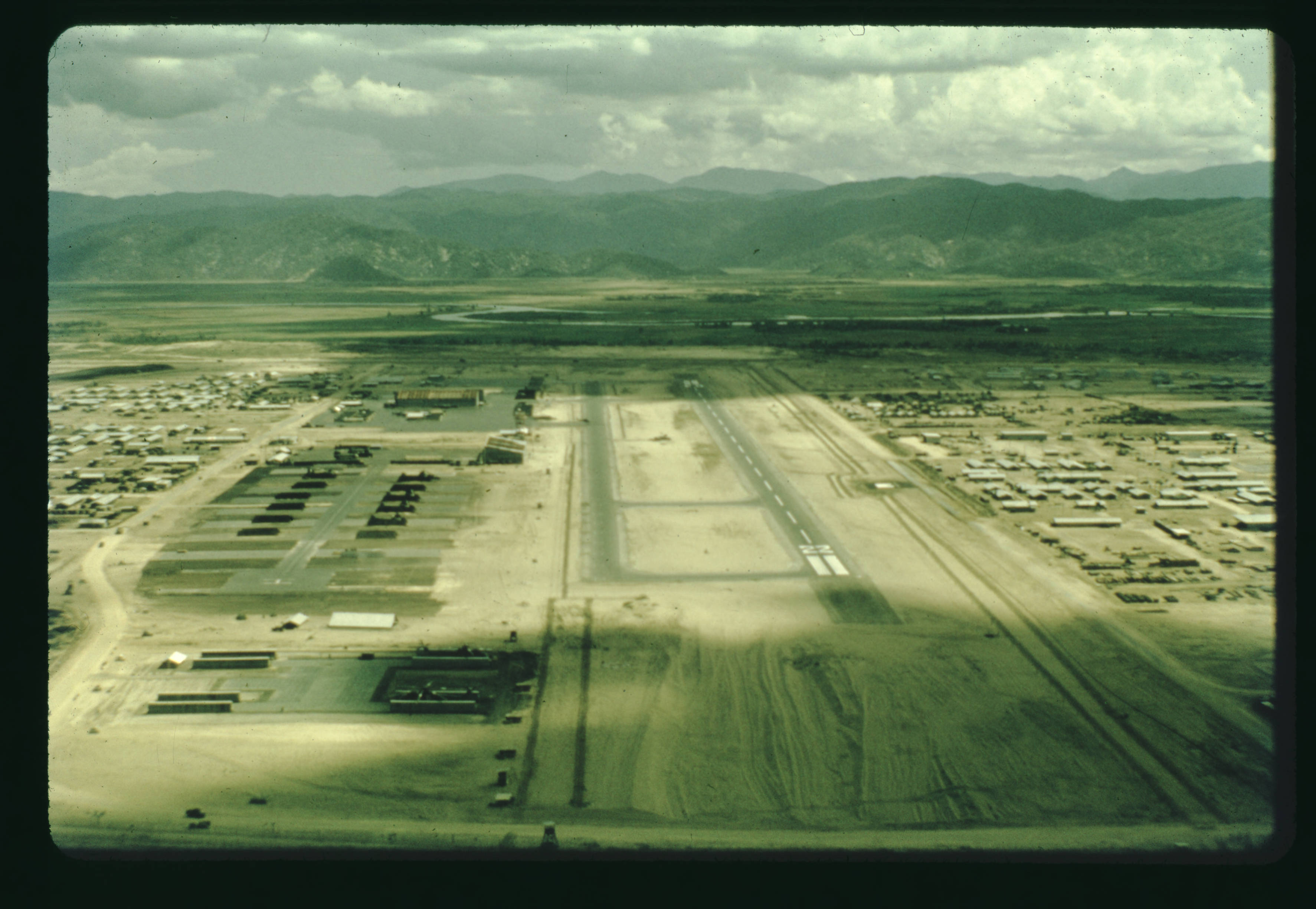
- Phú Hiệp Army Airfield, 13 July 1968

Site information
- Operator: Army of the Republic of Vietnam (ARVN); United States Army (US Army)
- Condition: Abandoned

Location
- Shown within Vietnam
- Coordinates: 12°59′06″N 109°22′47″E

Site history
- Built: 1966
- Built by: 577th Engineer Battalion
- In use: 1966-1970
- Battles/wars: Vietnam War

Garrison information
- Garrison: 1st Brigade, 4th Infantry Division; 173rd Airborne Brigade

Airfield information
- Elevation: 20 feet (6 m) AMSL
Runways
Direction	Length and surface
00/00	3,700 feet (1,128 m) PSP

Tuy Hòa Base Camp (also known as Phú Hiệp Airfield or Phú Hiệp Army Airfield) is a former U.S. Army base southeast of Tuy Hòa in Phú Yên Province Vietnam.

== History ==
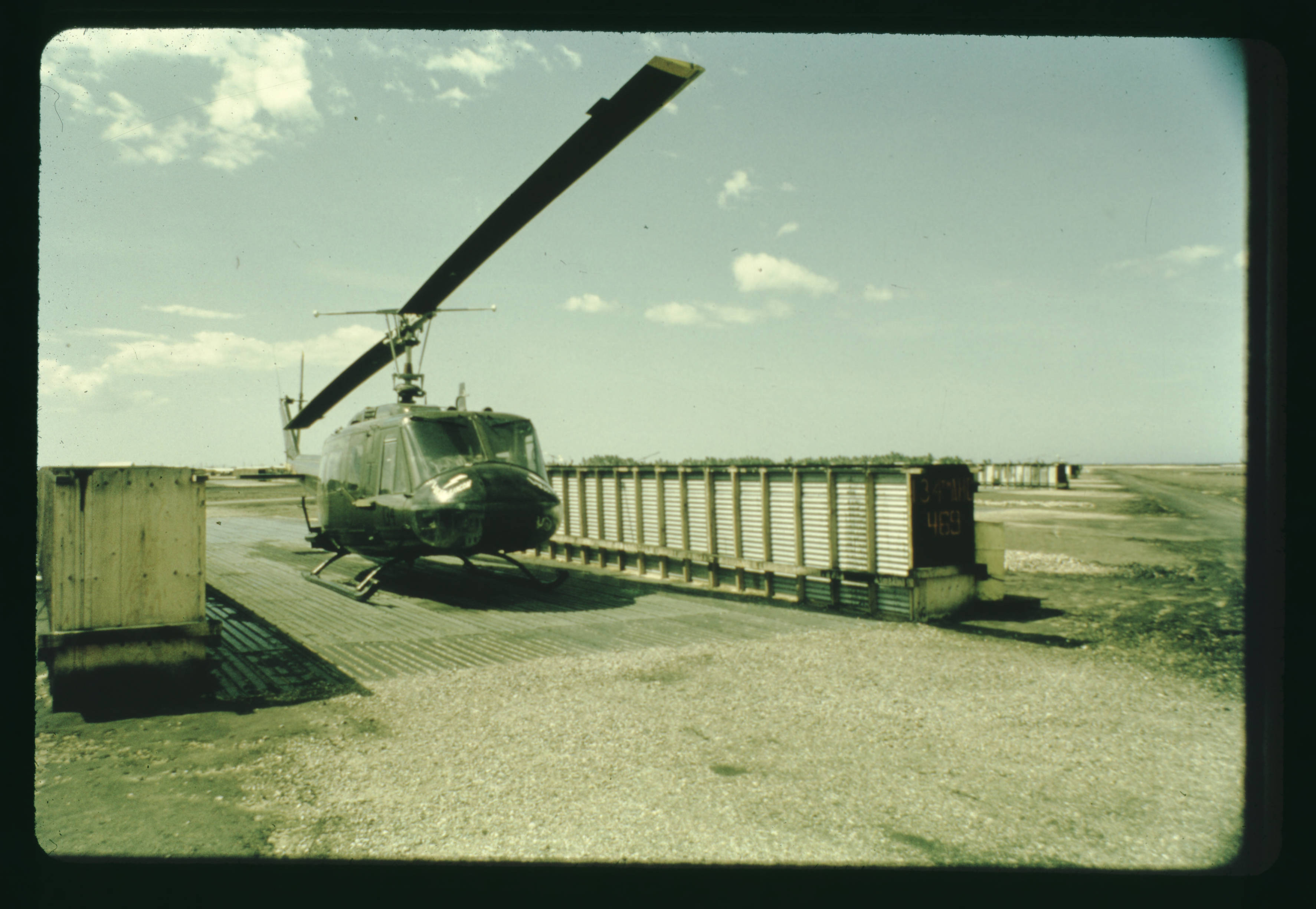
UH-1 in revetment, 13 July 1968

The base was located approximately 5 km east of Highway 1 and 7 km southeast of Tuy Hoa Air Base.

The base was used by the 1st Brigade, 4th Infantry Division comprising:

- 1st Battalion, 8th Infantry
- 3rd Battalion, 8th Infantry
- 1st Battalion, 12th Infantry

from October 1966 to June 1967.

The 173rd Airborne Brigade was based at Tuy Hòa from October–November 1967.

Other units stationed at Tuy Hòa/Phú Hiệp included:

- 3rd Battalion, 22nd Infantry (December 1970-January 1972)
- 91st Evacuation Hospital (December 1966-July 1969)
- 203rd Reconnaissance Airplane Company (October 1967-July 1970)
- 225th Aviation Company
- 268th Aviation Battalion
- 577th Engineer Battalion
- 136TH Light Maintenance Company
- 24th Transportation Company

Once the U.S. Air Force ceased operations at Tuy Hòa Air Base in October 1970 the U.S. Army units based at Tuy Hòa/Phú Hiệp moved to Tuy Hòa Air Base and the facility was closed.

== Accidents and incidents ==
- 2 December 1967 Bell UH-1D Iroquois #66-00811 of the 48th Assault Helicopter Company disappeared after taking off from Phú Hiệp with 4 crew and passengers on board in bad weather, the remains of the crew were recovered in 1993
- 10 July 1971 UH-1C #66-00636 of the 134th Assault Helicopter Company crashed at Phú Hiệp while on a mechanical check flight from Tuy Hòa Air Base killing all 3 crew and passengers.
- 2 April 1971 Boeing CH-47 Chinook #67-18545 of the 180th Aviation Company (Assault Support Helicopter), was destroyed by an explosion and fire when it experienced a blade strike with a revetment while taxiing and was totally destroyed.

== Current use ==
The base is abandoned and turned over to farmland and housing.
