= Operation Dragon Fire (Vietnam War) =

1967 military operation

- Part of the Vietnam War
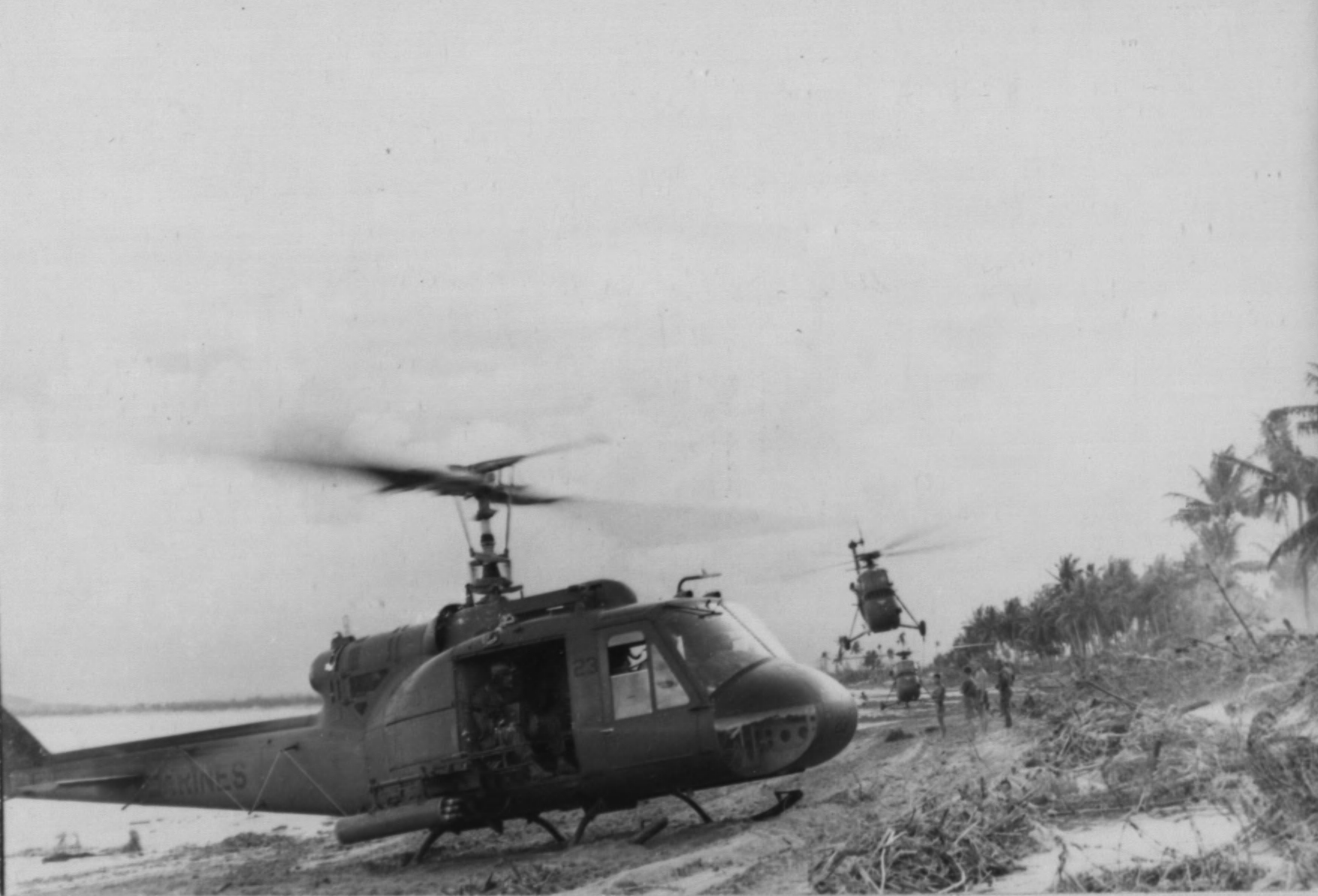
- VMO-6 UH-1E gunship and two HMM-263 UH-34Ds support 2nd Marine Brigade forces, 18 October 1967
Date	5 September – 31 October 1967
Location	Batangan Peninsula, Quảng Ngãi Province, South Vietnam

Belligerents
South Korea	Viet Cong

Commanders and leaders
BG Kim Yun-sang	

Units involved
2nd Marine Brigade	48th Battalion

Casualties and losses
46 killed	412 killed 59 weapons recovered

Operation Dragon Fire was an operation conducted by the South Korean 2nd Marine Brigade on the Batangan Peninsula, Quảng Ngãi Province, lasting from 5 September to 31 October 1967. The event and much of Korean Marines activities in the region was described as part of a wide-scale depopulation of the region.

== Prelude ==
The Batangan Peninsula was a well-known Viet Cong (VC) stronghold and had been the scene of several previous Allied operations, including Operation Piranha in 1965. In 1966 the peninsula became part of the Tactical Area of Responsibility of the 2nd Marine Brigade. In response to significant losses of Korean forces to regular units of VC during ambushes, the Koreans begun attacking civilian areas in what was described as a "near-complete destruction of civilian life in the Quảng Ngãi region." In early September 1967 intelligence indicated that the VC 48th Battalion had moved into the peninsula for recruitment and resupply.

== Operation ==
On 5 September, 2nd Marine Brigade commander, BG Kim Yun-sang deployed 3 Battalions to sweep the peninsula, while the fourth constructed a base at the south of the peninsula. By the end of September the Marines claimed to have killed 404 VC and captured 14 and 28 weapons (described as a "remarkably high ratio of kills to weapons captured"), while losing 39 killed.

During October the Marines claimed to have killed 137 VC and captured 17 weapons for the loss of seven killed.

== Aftermath ==
Operation Dragon Fire officially concluded on 31 October, with the ROK claiming that VC losses were 541 killed and 59 weapons recovered, ROK losses were 46 killed. An unknown number may have been civilians. The area reverted to VC control and many civilians would join the VC.
