= Battle of Gwansan =

Battle in 554 between Paekche and Silla shaping Korea's political landscape

The Battle of Gwansanseong or Gwansan (Korean: 관산성전투) refers to an altercation between the former allies Paekche and Silla in the Han River basin in 554, in which Paekche’s king perished at the hands of Silla. It marks the break of the alliance between Silla and Paekche and Silla’s rise to sovereignty over the Korean peninsula.

== Political situation leading up to the Battle of Gwansanseong ==
=== Goguryeo’s expansion ===
In 427, Goguryeo’s King Jangsu moved the kingdom’s capital from Gungnaeseong to Pyeongyang on the Taedong River, centering its power firmly in the Korean peninsula. The strategic location amid fertile land allowed for cultural and economic prosperity. King Jangsu steadily pressed southward, forcing Paekche to relocate its own capital from Hanseong (modern day Seoul) on the Han River south to Ungjin in the Chungcheong region in 474/475 after a violent siege on Hanseong, during which Paekche’s king was killed. Silla’s relief force of ten thousand men arrived too late to aid Paekche. With this relocation, Paekche lost control of the Han River basin, which instead was seized by Goguryeo. The following decades were marked by Goguryeo’s repeated invasions of both Silla and Paekche

=== Paekche and Silla as allies (433-554) ===
From the mid-5th century to the mid-6th century Paekche and Silla maintained a military alliance against Goguryeo, that was formed in 433 as a result of Goguryeo’s expansion. While this alliance is considered to have lasted 120 years, it was likely not upheld consistently during this time as indicated in the Samguk Sagi, which mentions Paekche’s recurring pleas for peace. Despite that, between 433 and 554, Paekche and Silla regularly aided each other in defense against Goguryeo, and their alliance was reinforced through marriages

=== Regaining the Han River basin ===
After Paekche’s loss of the Han basin in 475, Paekche’s kings focused on leading the kingdom back to its former glory. Among other efforts, Paekche’s capital was relocated to Sabi (present-day Buyeo County) and Paekche was temporarily renamed Nambuyeo in 538. Simultaneously, Silla’s advances in agricultural technology and the adoption of Buddhism between 527 and 535 promoted change in Silla’s society, leading to a sense of national unity and solidarity in the newly centralized state. By 551, both kingdoms had strengthened again and were ready to attack Goguryeo together with Gaya. Goguryeo, which had to defend itself on multiple borders due to other threats in the north and west, was unable to respond adequately to the invasion in the south. Upon their victory, Paekche restored six districts to their territory and Silla, taking advantage of Goguryeo’s weakened state, obtained ten counties in the upper reach

=== Silla’s betrayal ===
Paekche’s joy over the reacquisition of parts of its former Han River territory was short-lived. In 552, representatives of Paekche and Gaya had urgently requested military aid from Wa, claiming that Silla and Goguryeo had formed an alliance against them. Over the following year, Paekche’s concern about the threat Silla posed, mounted. The situation escalated in July of 553, when Silla seized Paekche’s northeastern territory

== The Battle of Gwansanseong ==
For years, Goguryeo had been Paekche’s primary adversary. Paekche’s king, King Seong, felt betrayed. He asked Wa for help. Wa relied on Paekche for industrial and cultural goods and promised to support Paekche with soldiers. In July of 554, King Seong led roughly estimated 30,000 allied Paekche, Wa and Gaya forces against Silla in the Battle of Gwansansoeng

At first, the situation seemed dire for Silla, who was unable to sufficiently defend Mount Gwansan Fortress against Paekche’s allied forces, despite great efforts. Paekche’s Crown Prince Yeochang established Fortress Gutamora as a base, from where he coordinated his attacks on Gwansanseong. The Nihon Shoki tells us that on December 9, Gwansanseong was set on fire by archers, and finally fell into Paekche’s hands. But the battle, which had dragged on for months, had taken its toll on the Paekche Crown Prince, who had endured extended periods of time without sleep or food. Wanting to comfort his struggling son, Paekche’s King Seong led a small force to Mount Gwansan Fortress in December 554. But he never reached Gwansanseong. Ambushed by Silla forces, he was decapitated under the pretense of having broken the alliance.

When news of King Seong's death spread, the morale of the Paekche army plummeted, while the Silla army's morale soared. Encouraged, the Silla army launched an all-out offensive, and the Paekche army collapsed. It was a crushing defeat for Paekche, one that would restructure the power relations on the Korean peninsula.

=== Geographical location of Gwansanseong Fortress ===
The Samguk Sagi reports that Paekche’s king led his army in the attack on Mount Gwansan Fortress in 554., but more recent research questions whether the battle of Gwansanseong was limited to one fortress. The battle of Gwansanseong was likely fought across a whole administrate district, especially given the duration of the battle

=== Paekche’s Army ===
The Samguk Sagi claims that Silla killed 29,600 soldiers and not even a single horse lived. An estimated 10,000 Paekche soldiers were joined by 1,000 Wa naval troops and 18,600 Gaya troops in their war efforts against Silla, totaling an army of about 29,600 soldiers

== Political consequences of Silla’s victory ==
The victory at Gwansanseong consolidated Silla's control over the Han River basin, and the fate of the Gaya forces that had joined forces with Paekche was in Silla's hands. According to the Paekche Annals, in subsequent years, Silla and Paekche were often in conflict, although Silla always emerged victorious

Ultimately, the Battle of Gwansanseong, which confirmed Silla's claim to the Han River basin, served as the backdrop and cornerstone of the Silla-led reunification of the Three Kingdoms.
