= Dongdan Kingdom =

926–930 puppet state in Manchuria

Dongdan 東丹
- 926–936
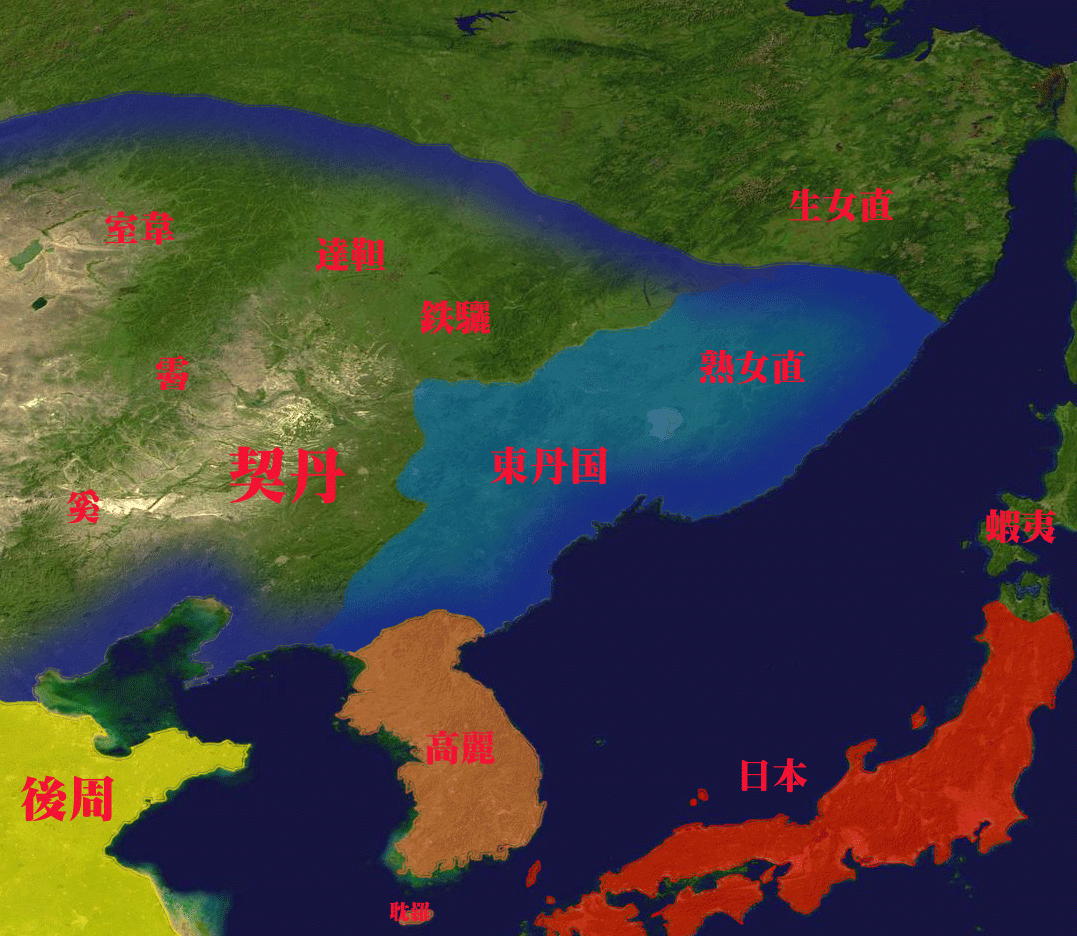
- The area controlled by the Liao Dynasty. Dongdan is shaded in blue.
- Capital: Huhan (926–928); Liaoyang (928–936)
- Common languages: Khitan language, Goguryeo language
- Religion: Buddhism, Taoism, Confucianism and Shamanism
- Government: Monarchy
- History
  - Established: 926 926
  - Annexed by the Liao dynasty: 936 936
Preceded by	Succeeded by
Balhae	Liao dynasty; Jeongan
- Today part of: China; North Korea; Russia

Dongdan (926–936) (simplified Chinese: 东丹; traditional Chinese: 東丹; Khitan language: Dan Gur), was a puppet kingdom established by the Liao dynasty to rule the former realm of Balhae (Bohai) in eastern Manchuria. The territory was later absorbed into the Liao dynasty.

== History ==
After conquering Balhae (Bohai) in 926, the Liao crown prince Yelü Bei ascended to the throne of Dongdan at the Huhan fortress, the former capital of Balhae, in today's Mudanjiang, Heilongjiang Province. The state used Dongdan as its Chinese name, meaning the Eastern Dan Gur (Bohai), in respect to the Liao dynasty in the west. The term Dongdan is only found in Chinese texts; the Khitan equivalent is "Dan country" (Dan Gur), similar to Silla's and Goryeo's use of the word "Dan" 丹 as a derogatory term for the states and people of Manchuria.

However, political tension soon evolved between Yelü Bei and his younger brother Yelü Deguang, who took the imperial throne of the Liao dynasty after their father Yelü Abaoji died, en route to his homeland from a relatively successful campaign against the Later Tang. The new emperor ordered his elder brother to move his capital from Huhan in eastern Manchuria to Liaoyang in western Manchuria.

Yelü Bei obeyed the imperial order but soon fled to North China to avoid possible assassination in 930. Yelü Bei's son was elevated to the new king of Dongdan, but the kingdom was annexed by the Liao dynasty in 936. The Balhae people created the Jeongan kingdom soon after the dissolution of Dongdan to prevent a full occupation by the Liao Khitans. A minority of historians suggest Dongdan was annexed in 982. On the other hand, some believe that Dongdan was never an "independent kingdom", but the former area of Balhae was instantly annexed in 926 by the Liao dynasty.

To continue Balhae's friendly relations with Japan, Dongdan sent a diplomatic mission over the Sea of Japan in 929. But the Japanese court in Kyoto rejected the mission from Dongdan, due to loyalty to the old Balhae regime.

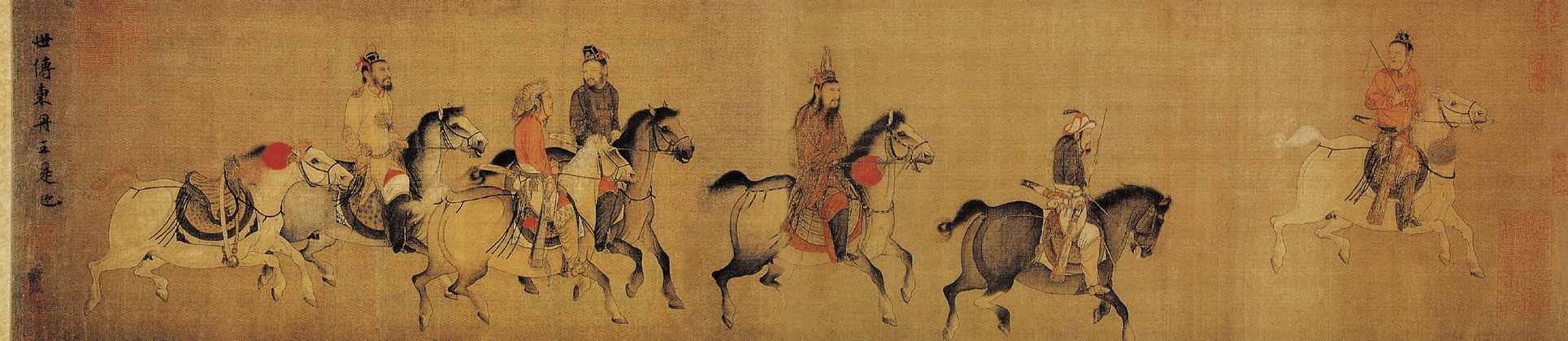
The King of Dongdan Goes Forth (東丹王出行圖), scroll, light colors on silk. 146.8 x 77.3 cm. National Palace Museum, Taipei

== See also ==
- Emperors family tree
- Liao dynasty
- Northern Liao
- Qara Khitai

== Bibliography ==
- Crossley, Pamela Kyle (2016). "Bohai/Parhae Identity and the Coherence of Dan gur under the Kitan/Liao Empire". International Journal of Korean History. 21 (1): 11–44. doi:10.22372/ijkh.2016.21.1.11.
