= First conflict in the Goryeo–Khitan War =

10th-century conflict between the Goryeo dynasty of Korea and the Liao dynasty of China

First Goryeo–Khitan War
- Part of Goryeo-Khitan Wars
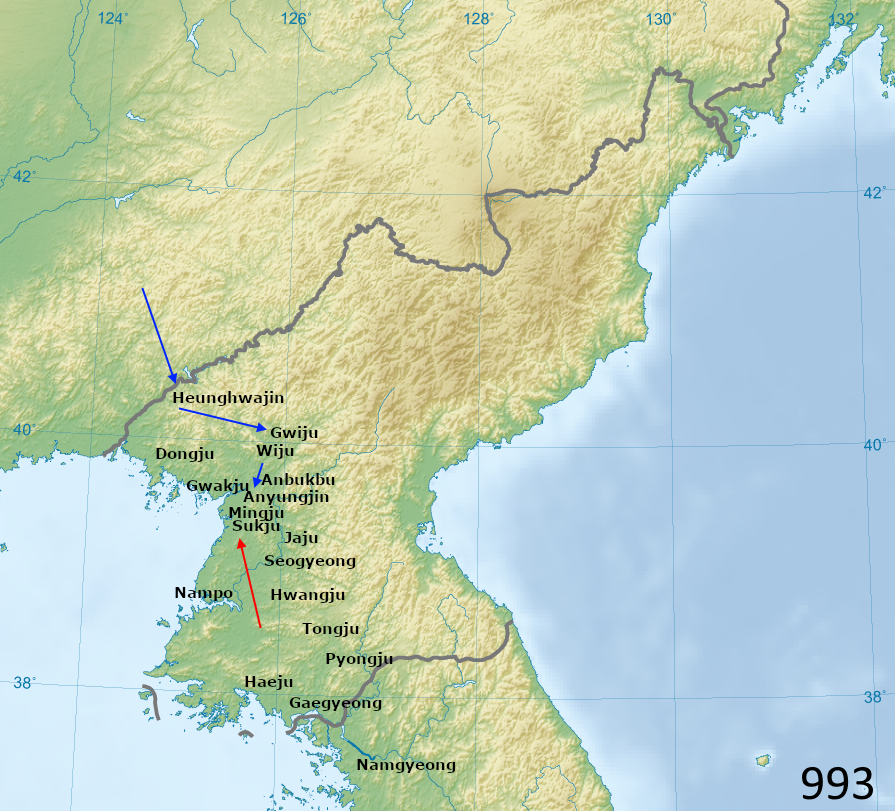
Date	November 993 - December 993
Location	Northern Korean Peninsula
Result	Inconclusive: Liao dynasty withdraws after achieving strategic goal without resorting to combat; Goryeo became a Liao tributary and adopted their calendar in 994; Liao gave Goryeo the land between the border of Liao and Goryeo, which was fortified to counter the Liao dynasty.

Belligerents
Goryeo	Liao dynasty

Commanders and leaders
Sŏ Hŭi; Tae To-su	Xiao Xunning

Strength
Unknown	Liao claimed 800,000 but the number is believed to be much lower.

Casualties and losses
Unknown	Unknown

The First Goryeo-Khitan War (Chinese: 第一次高麗契丹戰爭; Korean: 제1차 고려-거란 전쟁) was a 10th-century conflict between the Goryeo dynasty of Korea and the Khitan-led Liao dynasty of China near what is now the border between China and North Korea. It occurred in 993 and was the first of the Goryeo-Khitan Wars, which were continued with the Second Goryeo-Khitan War (1010) and Third Goryeo-Khitan War (1018).

In 993, the Liao dynasty invaded Goryeo's northwest border with an army that the Liao commander claimed to number 800,000, demanding Goryeo cede territories along the Yalu River. Goryeo appealed for assistance from the Song dynasty, with whom they had a military alliance, but no Song assistance came. After the initial battles, the Khitans made steady southward progress before reaching the Cheongcheon River, at which point they called for negotiations with Goryeo military leadership. While the Khitans initially demanded total surrender from Goryeo, and Goryeo initially appeared willing to consider it, Sŏ Hŭi was eventually able to convince the Khitans to accept Goryeo as a tributary state instead. By 994, regular diplomatic exchanges between the Khitans and Goryeo began.

They forced Goryeo to end its tributary relations with the Song dynasty, to become a Liao tributary state and to adopt Liao's calendar. With Goryeo's agreement of these requirements, Liao forces withdrew. The Liao dynasty gave Goryeo permission to incorporate the land along the border of the two states, which was occupied by Jurchen tribes that were troublesome to Liao, up to the Yalu River. In spite of the settlement, Goryeo continued to communicate with the Song dynasty, having strengthened its defenses by building fortresses in the newly gained northern territories.

== See also ==
- History of Korea
