= Tae Kwanghyŏn =

Last crown prince of Balhae (fl. 10th century)

- Hangul: 대광현
- Hanja: 大光顯
- RR: Dae Gwanghyeon
- MR: Tae Kwanghyŏn

Tae Kwanghyŏn (Korean: 대광현; Hanja: 大光顯; fl. 10th century) was the last Crown Prince of Balhae and a member of the Balhae royal family. He was the leader of the Balhae refugees who sought refuge in the Korean kingdom of Goryeo.

== Biography ==
Tae Kwanghyŏn was probably the first son of King Tae Insŏn, and the last crown prince of Balhae.

After several months of oppressing Balhae, the Khitan-led Liao dynasty army swept through Balhae and reached Shangjing Longquanfu (Sanggyeong), the capital city. The last king of Balhae surrendered to the Liao forces and the capital was captured. The king was captured, but the Crown Prince managed to gather an army and escape to Goryeo in hopes of gathering strength to avenge the humiliating defeat and downfall of his dynasty. Tae Kwanghyŏn arrived with his fellow Balhae people during the 1st month of 937, the 17th year of King Taejo's reign. He was warmly welcomed and included into the ruling family of Goryeo by Wang Geon, bringing a unification of the two successor states to Goguryeo.

He had at least one son, Tae Tosu, who later led Goryeo to victory against the Liao dynasty at the Battle of Anyung Fortress. He was also the ancestor of the Hyeopgye and Yeongsun Tae clan and the Miryang Dae clan, most of whose members currently reside in South Korea.

== In popular culture ==
- Portrayed by Kim Kyoo in the 2000–2002 KBS1 TV series Taejo Wang Geon.
- Portrayed by Heo Maeng-ho in the 2009 KBS TV series Empress Cheonchu.
- Portrayed by Lee Seo-jin in the 2005 Korean film Shadowless Sword.
