= Tae Chungsang =

Chinese name
- Traditional Chinese: 大仲象 or 乞乞仲象
Transcriptions
Standard Mandarin
- Hanyu Pinyin: Dà Zhòngxiàng or Qǐqǐ Zhòngxiàng

Korean name
- Hangul: 대중상 or 걸걸중상
- Hanja: 大仲象 or 乞乞仲象
Transcriptions
- Revised Romanization: Dae Jungsang or Geolgeol Jungsang
- McCune–Reischauer: Tae Chungsang or Kŏlgŏl Chungsang

Tae Chungsang (Korean: 대중상; Hanja: 大仲象; ?–698?), also known as Kŏlgŏl Chungsang (걸걸중상; 乞乞仲象), was a key contributor to the founding of Balhae, and the father of Tae Choyŏng (Ch. Da Zuorong), the actual founder of Balhae. Though much of the credit for the founding of Balhae went to his son, many historians still give credit to Tae Chungsang as the main supporter and leader in the founding of Balhae.

== Biography ==
According to Old Book of Tang, after Goguryeo was defeated by the Tang, Tae Choyŏng (Da Zuorong), the son of Tae Chungsang (Da Zhongxiang), led his relatives to settle in Yingzhou (營州, modern-day Chaoyang) until they were disturbed by a Khitan rebellion in 696. Li Jinzhong (Wushang Khan) of the Khitans along with his brother-in-law Sun Wanrong rebelled against Tang (Wu Zetian's Zhou Dynasty) hegemony, killed an abusive Tang commander, and attacked Hebei. Li died soon after and Sun succeeded him, only to be defeated by the Second Turkic Khaganate.

The population of Yingzhou fled eastward toward the Liao River during the turmoil. The Tang tried to appease Tae Chungsang and another leader named Kŏlsa Piu (Qisi Biyu), by granting them the titles of Duke of Zhen (Jin) and Duke of Xu (Heo) respectively. Kŏlsa Piu rejected the offer but was soon defeated by a Tang force led by Li Kaigu, while Tae Chungsang fled with his followers but also died around the same time. Tae Chungsang's son left the Liao River valley for Mt. Tianmen (in modern Jilin Province). The Old Book states that there, Tae Choyŏng united the Goguryeo and Mohe people to deal a heavy defeat upon the Tang forces led by Li Kaigu at the Battle of Tianmenling (Cheonmunnyeong). Because the route to Tae was cut off by the Kumo Xi and Khitans who had submitted to the Türks, Wu Zetian was unable to attack. Tae led his people east to the former area of Kyeru (Guilou) and built a walled settlement against Mount Dongmo (Dongmou) for protection. In 698, Tae Choyŏng declared himself King of Zhen (Jin).

Other sources provide different accounts of Tae Chungsang's role in the founding of Parhae. According to Crossley, there was no rebellion at all, and the leader of the Sumo Mohe (Songmal Malgal) assisted the Tang by suppressing Khitan rebels. As a reward the Tang acknowledged the leader as the local hegemon of a semi-independent state. According to Wang Zhenping, Mohe people and Goguryeo loyalists were deported to Yingzhou after the fall of Goguryeo. They waited there for an opportunity to strike back. In 696, three Mohe chieftains took advantage of the Khitan rebellion to move further east. Kŏlsa Piu was defeated while Tae Chungsang died around the same time, leaving Chungsang's foster son, Tae Choyŏng, in control of the group. Choyŏng defeated a Tang punitive expedition and led his people to live in Dunhua.

== Relationship to Tae Choyŏng ==
The Old Book and New Book give different names for the leader that fled Yingzhou with Kŏlsa Piu. According to the Old Book, it was Choyŏng who fled with Kŏlsa Piu while the New Book states that it was Chungsang and his son succeeded him after his death. One theory to explain this discrepancy is that Choyŏng and Chungsang are actually the same person. Tae Chungsang's other name was Kŏlgŏl Chungsang and he may have taken Tae Choyŏng as a more Sinitic name after he became king of Parhae. According to this theory, the New Book confused the two names and assumed that Choyŏng was the son of Chungsang.

== Ethnic identity ==
There is a theory that Tae Chungsang was a Khitan based on his title sheli, which is a Khitan office and title used in the Liao dynasty. According to the Wudai Huiyao (Important documents of the Five Dynasties), Chungsang was a Da Sheli. However, Song Ki-ho notes that the titles sheli and da sheli are not known to have been used by the Khitans in the 7th century. During the Tang dynasty, Sheli was the name of a prefecture settled by Turks on the Tang's western frontier. It was also the name of a conquered Goguryeo region under the Andong Protectorate. The conquered Goguryeo region known as Sheli (Sari) was grouped with other prefectures in the vicinity of Liaodong or on Goguryeo's northwestern frontier. Mark E. Byington suggests that Sheli was thus likely to have been a Mohe community located north of Liaodong. Another theory is that the author (Wang Pu: 922-982) of the Wudai Huiyao simply used the title erroneously since he was more familiar with the Khitan title used at the time.

Historical sources give different accounts of the ethnicity and background of Tae Chungsang's son, Tae Choyŏng (Ch. Da Zuorong). Their contents and interpretations are part of a historiographical dispute surrounding Parhae. The Old Book of Tang states that Tae was a Mohe, a Tungusic people related to Jurchens and later Manchus, but also links him with the Korean kingdom of Goguryeo via the term biezhong (gaoli biezhong; 高麗別種. Literally speaking, biezhong means "separate kind." Gaoli biezhong is interpreted as meaning "a branch of the Goguryeo people" by Korean historians, but as "distinct from Goguryeo" by Japanese and Chinese researchers. The mainstream Korean position, as represented by Yun Jae-woon, is that the term biezhong "implies that 'branch' is closely related to the main group".

Seo Gil-su argues that the meaning of "biezhong" can be understood by looking at its use in other cases and the description of Parhae's customs as being similar to Goguryeo and the Khitans. Seo believes that "biezhong" as well as other terms such as "bielei" and "zhong" are all used similarly in the Old and New books to clarify the origin of things, such as Goguryeo and Buyeo or the Kumo Xi and the Xiongnu. Lei Yijie and Yao Yucheng argue that biezhong does not indicate ethnicity at all and was used in Chinese official sources in situations where different groups with similar culture occupied the same area. Kaizaburo Hino suggests that Tae was a member of the Mohe that were incorporated into the Goguryeo populace, as the need to explicitly mention gaoli biezhong would have otherwise been unnecessary. Historian Richard McBride states that Tae was most likely an "ethnic Malgal/Mohe fully assimilated to Goguryeo culture, and thus able to rally support from both the remaining Goguryeo nobles and Malgal tribespeople." Song Ki-ho and No T'aedon argue that the Mohe were Tungusic people who had been assimilated into Goguryeo and Parhae, thereby making the Mohe part of Korean history. Under Song's framework for Parhae's ethnicity, Tae Choyŏng was a "Koguryŏ person of Sumo Mohe ancestry” and Parhae was an ancestor kingdom of modern Korean states regardless of the ethnicity of the ruling house.

The New Book of Tang refers to Tae Choyŏng and his state as Sumo Mohe affiliated with Goguryeo. Chinese scholars have argued that Parhae's founder was a member of the Sumo Mohe and Parhae's royalty were Mohe rather than Goguryeo, based on this account. Li Jiancai believes that if the authors of the New Book had intended to say that Tae was a Goguryeo person, they would have done so more directly, and therefore biezhong implies difference. Yun challenged this by arguing that though he may have been Mohe, they "would have already undergone a substantial process of Koguryŏ-ization" while providing military service to Goguryeo over two generations. On the other hand, Seo argues that the New Book is unreliable because it was written a hundred years after the Old Book and more Sinocentric due to the influence of the Song dynasty. Han Ciu-cheol notes that Chinese historians often cite the New Book in their arguments, whereas Korean historians often cite the Old Book due to their conflicting viewpoints on the ethnicity of Parhae's founder as well as the nature of Parhae's society.

The Samguk yusa, a 13th-century collection of Korean history and legends, describes Tae as a Sumo Mohe leader. However, it gives another account of Tae being a former Goguryeo general, citing a now-lost Sillan record. Alexander Kim considers this unlikely since Goguryeo fell in 668 while Tae died in 719, and young men could not receive the rank of general.

== Family ==
The most notable and famous of his children was his eldest, Tae Choyŏng. Tae Chungsang had another son, Tae Yabal, and probably also had other children besides Tae Choyŏng because the Balhae Royal line consisted of two lineages, one from Tae Choyŏng and the other from Tae Yabal.

== In popular culture ==
- Portrayed by Im Hyuk in the 2006–2007 KBS TV series Dae Jo-yeong.

== See also ==
- History of Manchuria
- History of Korea

== Bibliography ==
- Byington, Mark E. (2016), The Ancient State of Puyŏ in Northeast Asia: Archaeology and Historical Memory, Cambridge (Massachusetts) and London: Harvard University Asia Center, ISBN 978-0-674-73719-8
- Crossley, Pamela Kyle (1997), The Manchus, Blackwell Publishing
- Kim, Alexander (2011), The Historiography of Bohai in Russia
- Kim, Alexander (2015), The Problem of the Ethnic Composition of the Bohai State – A Comparative Analysis of Russian and Korean Materials
- Sloane, Jesse D. (2014a), Parhae in Historiography and Archaeology: International Debate and Prospects for Resolution
- Wang, Zhenping (2013), Tang China in Multi-Polar Asia: A History of Diplomacy and War, University of Hawaii Press

Tae Chungsang House of Tae Died: 698
Regnal titles
New creation	Duke of Zhen (Jin); 696–698	Succeeded by Go of Balhae as King of Zhen (Jin)
