= Li Kuge =

Khitan tribal leader

Dahe Kuge (simplified Chinese: 大贺窟哥; traditional Chinese: 大賀窟哥) or Li Kuge (Chinese: 李窟哥) was a Khitan during the Tang dynasty.

== History ==
During the Tang dynasty, Dahe Kuge was given the surname Li (李) from the Tang government because it should be distinguished from a battle in East Manchuria. Li Jinzhong was a grandchild of Li Kuge.

== Family ==
- Li Jinzhong, grandson of Li Kuge
- Li Kaigu, adopted son of Li Jinzhong
- Sun Wanrong, one's wife's brother of Li Jinzhong
