= Ko of Parhae =

Founding King of Balhae (r. 689–719)

King Ko of Parhae 발해고왕 (渤海高王)

King of Parhae
- Predecessor: Dynasty founder
- Reign: 698–719
- Successor: King Mu
- Born: Tae Choyŏng/Dae Joyoung/Dae Joyeong (대조영; 大祚榮); Unknown
- Died: 719
- Issue: Muye, King Mu; Mun-ye
Names
- Tae Choyŏng (대조영; 大祚榮)
Posthumous name
- Ko/Go (고왕. 高王)
- House: House of Tae
- Father: Tae Chungsang

Go of Balhae

Chinese name
- Chinese: 高王
Transcriptions
Standard Mandarin
- Hanyu Pinyin: Gāowáng
- Wade–Giles: Kaowang

Given in Chinese
- Chinese: 大祚荣
Transcriptions
Standard Mandarin
- Hanyu Pinyin: Dà Zuòróng
- Wade–Giles: Ta Tsojung

Korean name
- Hangul: 고왕
- Hanja: 高王
Transcriptions
- Revised Romanization: Go Wang
- McCune–Reischauer: Ko Wang

Given in Korean
- Hangul: 대조영
- Hanja: 大祚榮
Transcriptions
- Revised Romanization: Dae Joyeong
- McCune–Reischauer: Tae Choyŏng

Tae Choyŏng or Dae Joyoung/Dae Joyeong (Korean: 대조영; Hanja: 大祚榮), also rendered as Da Zuorong (simplified Chinese: 大祚荣; traditional Chinese: 大祚榮; pinyin: Dàzuòróng) in Chinese, was the first king of Parhae that reigned from 699 to 719.

He is more commonly known as King Ko/King Go (Korean: 고왕; Hanja: 高王; RR: Go Wang; MR: Ko Wang) in Korea, and as King Gao (Chinese: 高王; pinyin: Gāo Wáng) in China.

Historical sources describe Tae Choyŏng in different ways in relation to the Tungusic Mohe people and the Korean kingdom of Goguryeo. The interpretation of the historical sources and Tae Choyŏng's ethnic identity are part of a historiographical dispute surrounding Parhae's place in Korea and China's national history.

== Life ==
According to Old Book of Tang, Tae Choyŏng was the son of Tae Chungsang (Da Zhongxiang). After Goguryeo was defeated by the Tang, Tae Choyŏng led his relatives to settle in Yingzhou (營州, modern-day Chaoyang) until they were disturbed by a Khitan rebellion in 696. Li Jinzhong (Wushang Khan) of the Khitans along with his brother-in-law Sun Wanrong rebelled against Tang (Wu Zetian's Zhou Dynasty) hegemony, killed an abusive Tang commander, and attacked Hebei. Li died soon after and Sun succeeded him, only to be defeated by the Second Turkic Khaganate.

The population of Yingzhou fled eastward toward the Liao River during the turmoil. The Tang tried to appease Tae Chungsang and another leader named Kŏlsa Piu (Qisi Biyu), by granting them the titles of Duke of Zhen (Jin) and Duke of Xu (Heo) respectively. Kŏlsa Piu rejected the offer but was soon defeated by a Tang force led by Li Kaigu, while Tae Chungsang fled with his followers but also died around the same time. Tae Choyŏng left the Liao River valley for Mt. Tianmen (in modern Jilin Province). The Old Book states that there, Tae Choyŏng united the Goguryeo and Mohe people to deal a heavy defeat upon the Tang forces led by Li Kaigu at the Battle of Tianmenling (Cheonmunnyeong). Because the route to Tae was cut off by the Kumo Xi and Khitans who had submitted to the Türks, Wu Zetian was unable to attack. Tae led his people east to the former area of Kyeru (Guilou) and built a walled settlement against Mount Dongmo (Dongmou) for protection. In 698, Tae Choyŏng declared himself King of Zhen (Jin).

Other sources provide different accounts of Parhae's origin or differ in the details. According to Crossley, there was no rebellion at all, and the leader of the Sumo Mohe (Songmal Malgal) assisted the Tang by suppressing Khitan rebels. As a reward the Tang acknowledged the leader as the local hegemon of a semi-independent state. According to Wang Zhenping, Mohe people and Goguryeo loyalists were deported to Yingzhou after the fall of Goguryeo. They waited there for an opportunity to strike back. In 696, three Mohe chieftains took advantage of the Khitan rebellion to move further east. Kŏlsa Piu was defeated while Tae Chungsang died around the same time, leaving Chungsang's foster son, Tae Choyŏng, in control of the group. Choyŏng defeated a Tang punitive expedition and led his people to live in Dunhua.

In diplomatic communications between Silla and Jin, Silla attempted to confer investiture to Tae Choyŏng with the title of a fifth rank official: "Dae achan". Silla conferred this mid-ranking investiture partially out of a sense of superiority, but also because Parhae was a relatively new kingdom whereas Silla had been centuries old. The people of Jin did not know the system of ranks used in Silla and thus accepted the title. After a while, Tae Choyŏng realized the meaning of the title and sought to change Parhae's international status. He attempted to expand his influence in foreign politics involving the Tang/Wu Zhou, the Göktürks, the Khitan, Silla and some independent Mohe tribes. At first he dispatched an envoy to the Göktürks, allying against Tang/Wu Zhou. Then he reconciled himself with the Tang when Emperor Zhongzong was restored to the throne. In 713 or 714, the Tang dynasty recognized Tae Choyŏng as the "Prince of Bohai (Parhae)", the name for the sea surrounding Liaodong and Shandong.

Between 713 and 721, Silla constructed a northern wall to maintain active defences along the border.

Tae Choyŏng died in 719 and was succeeded by his son, Tae Muye (Da Wuyi, r. 719–737).

== Ethnic identity ==
Historical sources give different accounts of Tae Choyŏng's ethnicity and background. Their contents and interpretations are part of a historiographical dispute surrounding Parhae. The Old Book of Tang states that Tae was a Mohe, a Tungusic people related to Jurchens and later Manchus, but also links him with the Korean kingdom of Goguryeo via the term biezhong (gaoli biezhong; 高麗別種. Literally speaking, biezhong means "separate kind." Gaoli biezhong is interpreted as meaning "a branch of the Goguryeo people" by Korean historians, but as "distinct from Goguryeo" by Japanese and Chinese researchers. The mainstream Korean position, as represented by Yun Jae-woon, is that the term biezhong "implies that 'branch' is closely related to the main group".

Seo Gil-su argues that the meaning of "biezhong" can be understood by looking at its use in other cases and the description of Parhae's customs as being similar to Goguryeo and the Khitans. Seo believes that "biezhong" as well as other terms such as "bielei" and "zhong" are all used similarly in the Old and New books to clarify the origin of things, such as Goguryeo and Buyeo or the Kumo Xi and the Xiongnu. Lei Yijie and Yao Yucheng argue that biezhong does not indicate ethnicity at all and was used in Chinese official sources in situations where different groups with similar culture occupied the same area. Kaizaburo Hino suggests that Tae was a member of the Mohe that were incorporated into the Goguryeo populace, as the need to explicitly mention gaoli biezhong would have otherwise been unnecessary. Historian Richard McBride states that Tae was most likely an "ethnic Malgal/Mohe fully assimilated to Goguryeo culture, and thus able to rally support from both the remaining Goguryeo nobles and Malgal tribespeople." Song Ki-ho and No T'aedon argue that the Mohe were Tungusic people who had been assimilated into Goguryeo and Parhae, thereby making the Mohe part of Korean history. Under Song's framework for Parhae's ethnicity, Tae Choyŏng was a "Koguryŏ person of Sumo Mohe ancestry” and Parhae was an ancestor kingdom of modern Korean states regardless of the ethnicity of the ruling house.

The New Book of Tang refers to Tae Choyŏng and his state as Sumo Mohe affiliated with Goguryeo. Chinese scholars have argued that Parhae's founder was a member of the Sumo Mohe and Parhae's royalty were Mohe rather than Goguryeo, based on this account. Li Jiancai believes that if the authors of the New Book had intended to say that Tae was a Goguryeo person, they would have done so more directly, and therefore biezhong implies difference. Yun challenged this by arguing that though he may have been Mohe, they "would have already undergone a substantial process of Koguryŏ-ization" while providing military service to Goguryeo over two generations. On the other hand, Seo argues that the New Book is unreliable because it was written a hundred years after the Old Book and more Sinocentric due to the influence of the Song dynasty. Han Ciu-cheol notes that Chinese historians often cite the New Book in their arguments, whereas Korean historians often cite the Old Book due to their conflicting viewpoints on the ethnicity of Parhae's founder as well as the nature of Parhae's society.

The Samguk yusa, a 13th-century collection of Korean history and legends, describes Tae as a Sumo Mohe leader. However, it gives another account of Tae being a former Goguryeo general, citing a now-lost Sillan record. Alexander Kim considers this unlikely since Goguryeo fell in 668 while Tae died in 719, and young men could not receive the rank of general.

== Legacy ==
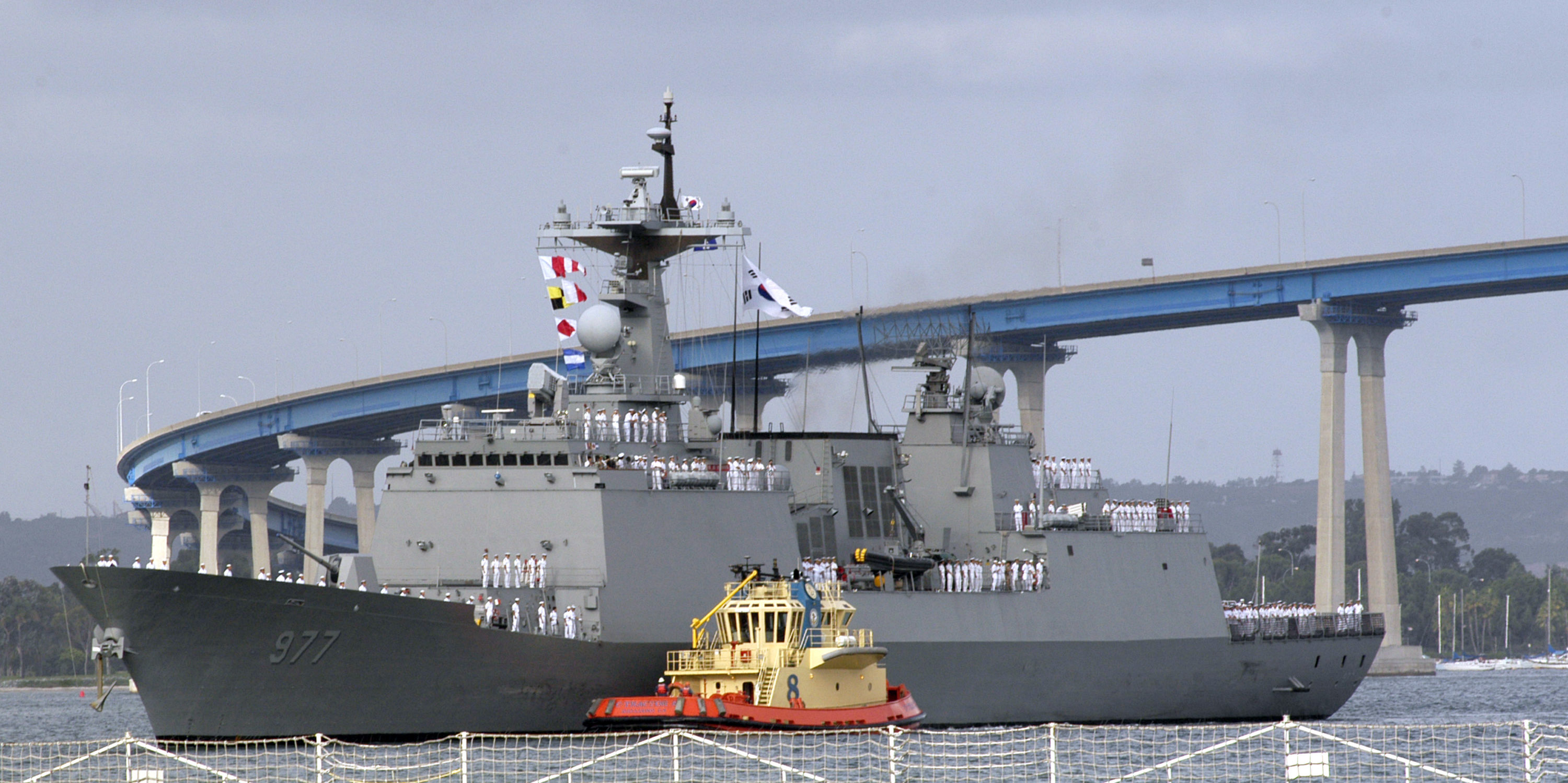
ROK navy warship, Dae Jo-yeong in San Diego, US.

After the fall of Parhae, Tae Kwanghyŏn, the last prince led many of the Parhae aristocracy into the Korean state, thus unifying the two successor states of Goguryeo. Tae Choyŏng's descendants include modern-day Koreans who bear the surname Tae, or Dae.

In South Korea, a television drama on KBS1 was launched since September 2006 in his honor. Roughly 30% (based on 2007 survey) of the South Korean viewers enjoyed this program..

The third Chungmugong Yi Sun-sin class destroyer commissioned by the Republic of Korea Navy is named Tae Choyŏng. KDX-II class destroyers are named after significant figures in Korean history such as admiral Yi Sun-sin.

The Chunbun Ancestral Rite is held annually in Parhae Village, North Gyeongsang Province in order to commemorate the achievements of Tae Choyŏng. The Gyeongsan City mayor participates in the event, which is open for public participation.

== In popular culture ==
- Portrayed by Choi Soo-jong in the 2006–2007 KBS TV series Dae Jo-yeong.

== See also ==
- Rulers of Korea

== Bibliography ==
- Crossley, Pamela Kyle (1997), The Manchus, Blackwell Publishing
- Kim, Alexander (2011a), Relations Between Bohai and Silla (7th to 9th Centuries): A Critical Analysis
- Kim, Alexander (2011), The Historiography of Bohai in Russia
- Kim, Alexander (2015), The Problem of the Ethnic Composition of the Bohai State – A Comparative Analysis of Russian and Korean Materials
- Sloane, Jesse D. (2014a), Parhae in Historiography and Archaeology: International Debate and Prospects for Resolution
- Wang, Zhenping (2013), Tang China in Multi-Polar Asia: A History of Diplomacy and War, University of Hawaii Press

Ko of Parhae House of Dae Died: 719
Regnal titles
Preceded by Dae Jung-sang as Duke of Zhen (Jin)	King of Zhen (Jin); 698–712	Succeeded by Himself as King of Balhae
Preceded by Himself as King of Zhen (Jin)	King of Balhae; 712–719	Succeeded by Mu
