= War trophy =

Items captured during battle

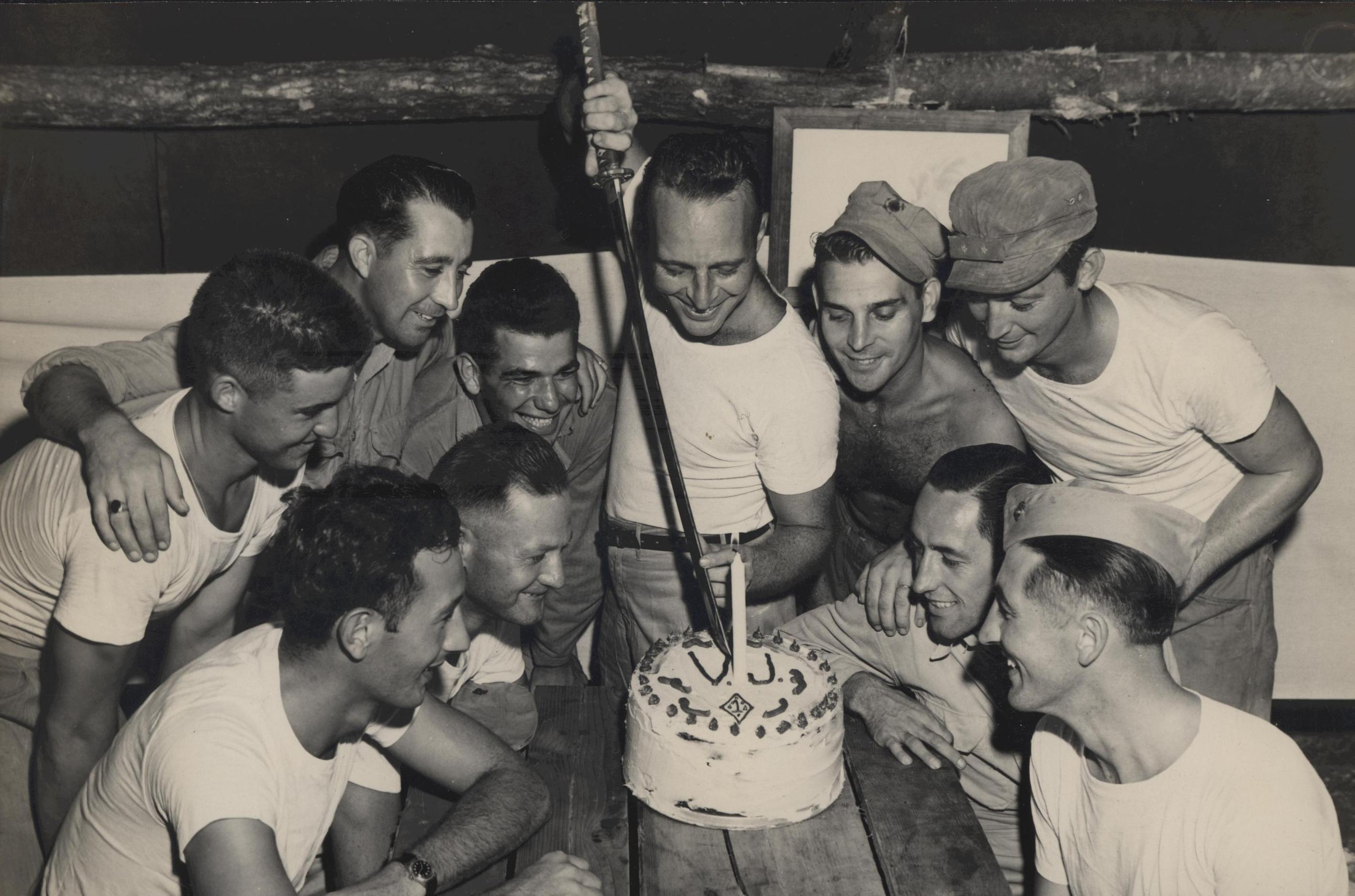
U.S. Marines cut a cake with a war trophy sword in celebration of V-J day, 1945

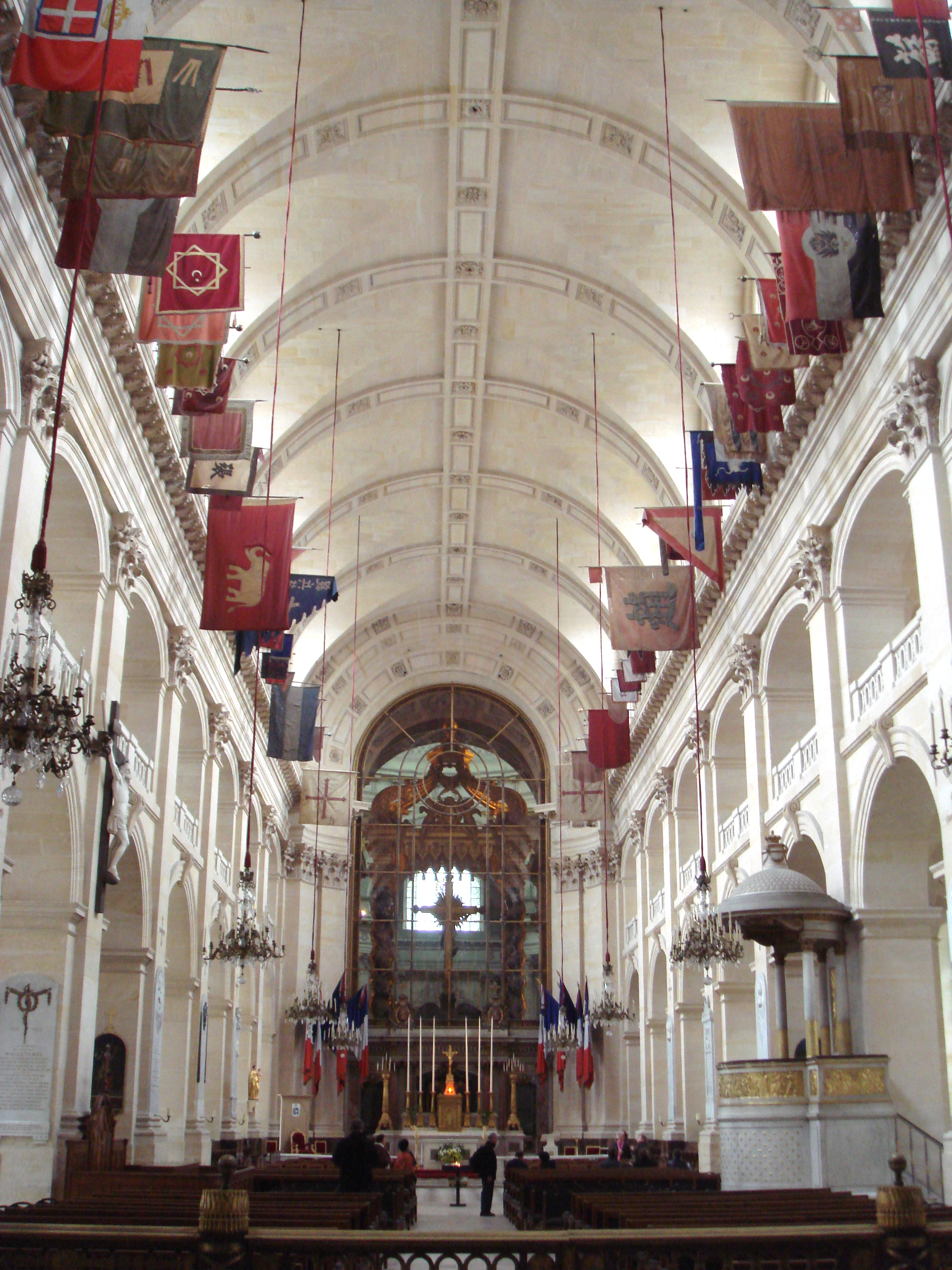
War trophies decorating the vault of the chapel of Saint-Louis-des-Invalides, in Paris.

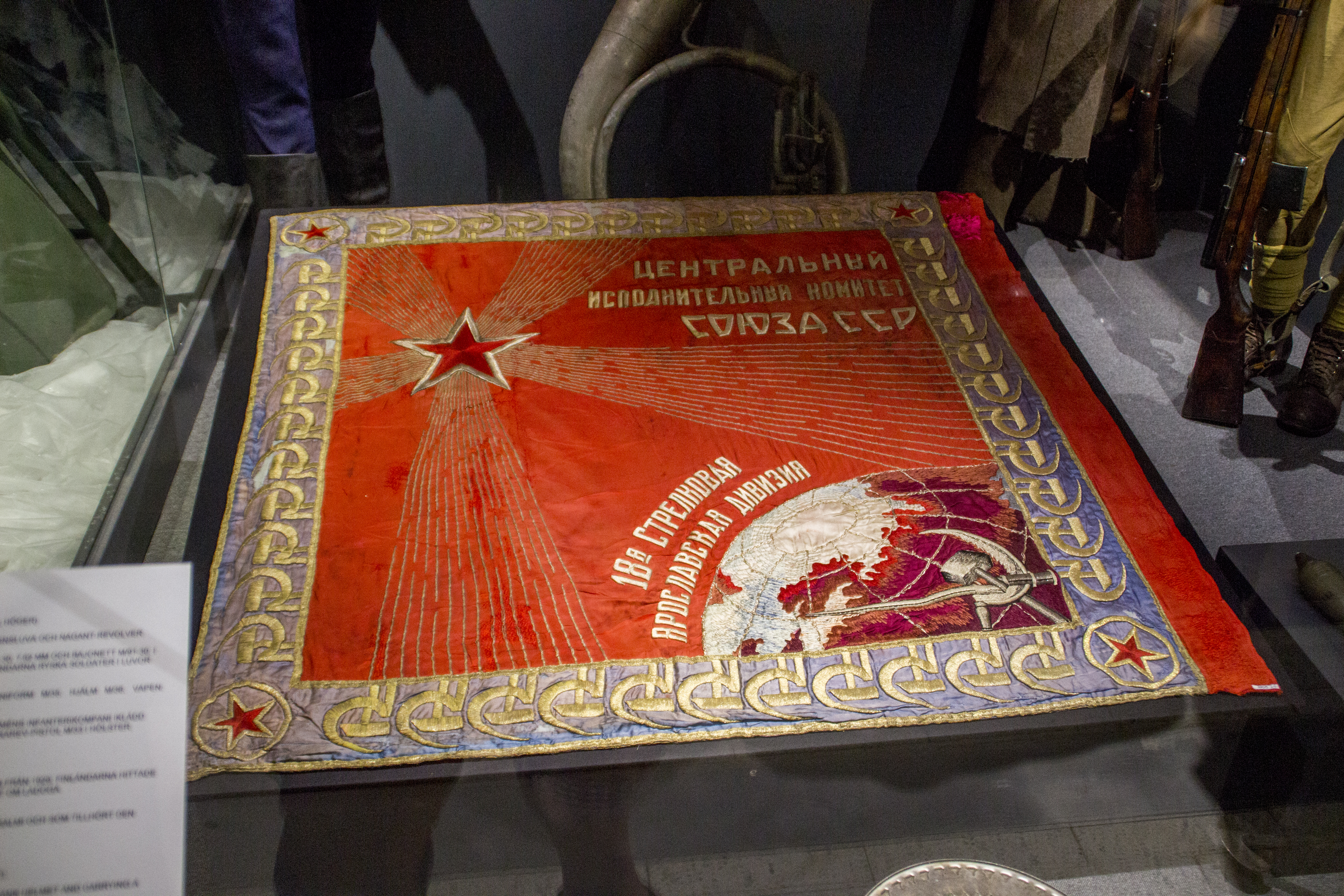
Flag, trophy of the Winter War

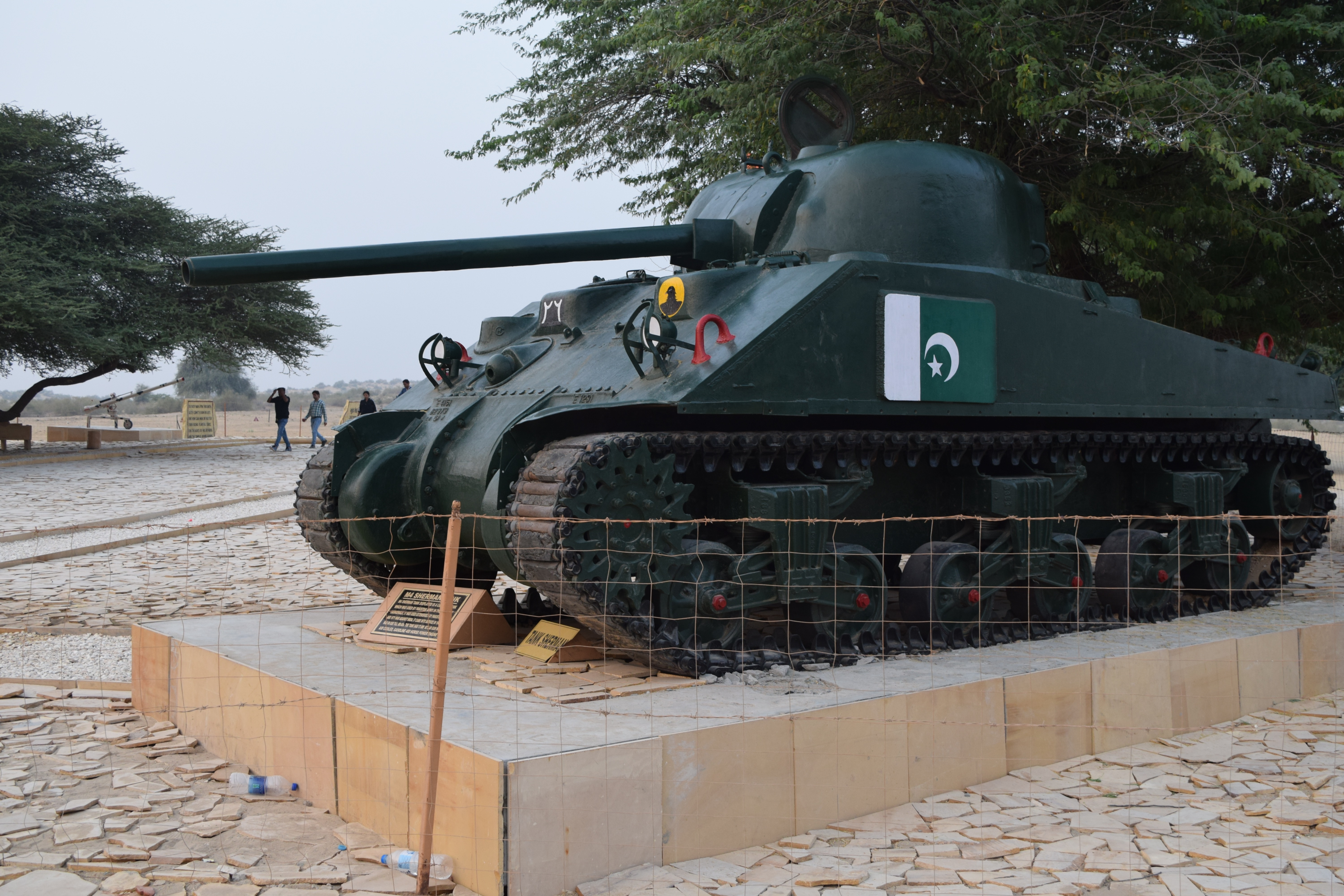
A war trophy from the Indo-Pakistani war of 1965 at Longewala, India (a Pakistani M4 Sherman)

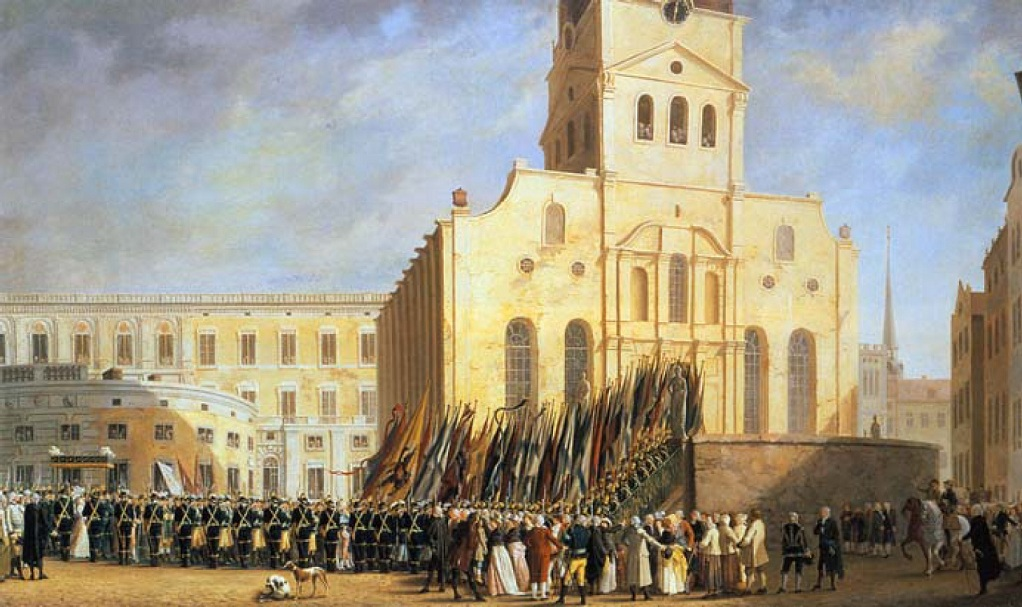
Russian flags and standards taken as trophies by the Swedish navy at the Battle of Svensksund being carried into Storkyrkan (1790), painting by Pehr Hilleström.

A war trophy is an item taken during warfare by an invading force. Common war trophies include flags, weapons, vehicles, and art.

== History ==
In ancient Greece and ancient Rome, military victories were commemorated with a display of captured arms and standards. A trophy (from the Greek tropaion) was originally a war memorial assembled from such items on a battlefield. The Roman triumph also displayed these items as well as cultural objects, which later came to be called war trophies. Body parts of slain enemies have sometimes served as trophies since antiquity, in a practice called human trophy collecting. The recovery of Roman eagles taken as trophies by enemy forces sometimes inspired years of added warfare.

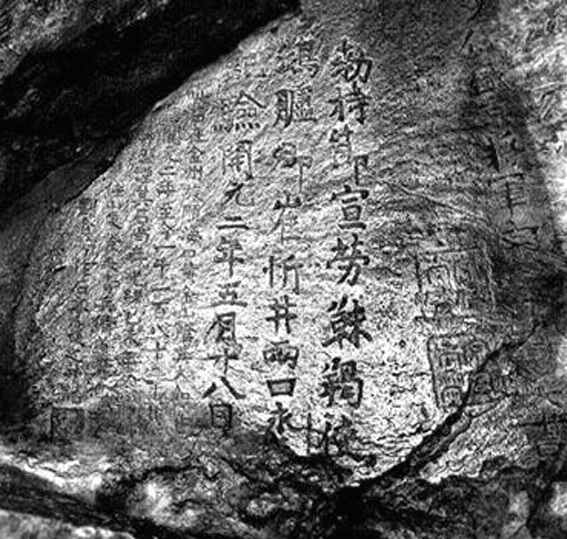
Having emerged victorious from the Russo-Japanese War, Japan looted the Honglujing Stele from occupied China as a war trophy; it remains within the grounds of the Tokyo Imperial Palace to this day.

In more recent times, it has been common for soldiers to return home with souvenirs, such as enemy weapons and flags, while larger military items captured in battle, particularly weaponry such as machine guns and artillery pieces, became the property of the state to which the soldiers responsible for the capture belonged.

In the 20th century, the victorious alliance states removed large quantities of property, including cultural objects. After the First World War, the Treaty of Versailles authorized the removal of large amounts of property from Germany, which it termed "reparations".

In medieval South Indian wars, there are accounts of victorious rulers taking statues and other objects from the enemy territories as war booty. Following the Vatapi campaign of 642 CE, local tradition holds that the Pallava commander Paranjothi brought back a Ganesha statue. The Mahavamsa states that during the Pandyan king Sri Mara Sri Vallabha’s invasion of Sri Lanka, he carried away wealth, including a golden Buddha statue, as booty. Furthermore, Chola sources state that following the Kalyani campaign of the Chola emperor Rajadhiraja, a door-guardian statue was brought back to the Chola country. In 1284 AD, during the reign of the Pandyan king Kulasekara I, a Pandyan expedition was sent to Sri Lanka under the command of Ariya Chakravarti. The expedition reached Subhagiri, the capital of Sinhalese and returned with war booty that reportedly included the Tooth Relic of the Buddha.

After the Second World War, the United States Army's 28th Infantry Division's 5,000 men left the European Theater of Operations with 20,000 war trophies. The Potsdam Conference authorized the removal of certain property from Germany, such as the merchant marine fleet. Germany, during the war, had removed large quantities of property from the countries that it had occupied. In some cases, for example the Soviet "trophy brigades", official looting was euphemised as the taking of "trophies".

In the present day, the taking of war trophies continues, but weapons that are taken home as souvenirs are often deactivated first. According to Julian Thompson, only a small number of soldiers will take home war trophies, to avoid trouble – in a highly publicized case in 2012, British soldier Danny Nightingale was subject to a court-martial for illegally bringing a Glock with him after his tour in Iraq.

== Cultural objects ==
Article 56 of the Hague Convention of 1907, stated:

The property of municipalities, that of institutions dedicated to religion, charity and education, the arts and sciences, even when State property, shall be treated as private property.

All seizure of, destruction or wilful damage done to institutions of this character, historic monuments, works of art and science, is forbidden, and should be made the subject of legal proceedings.

However, the article was not much respected during the remainder of the century.

In 1954, a further convention was signed at the Hague: Convention for the Protection of Cultural Property in the Event of Armed Conflict, and two protocols have strengthened its force.

Many works of art moved from their pre-war locations during the turmoils of the 20th century. UNESCO, the United Nations agency responsible for culture has been seeking to resolve issues relating to cultural objects displaced in connection with the Second World War. However, the conference in Spring 2007 failed to reach a consensus on a draft non-binding declaration.

== See also ==
- War loot
- Militaria
- Prize of war
- Prize (law)
- Trophy of arms
- Trophy (architectural)
- Helmet and spurs of Saint Olaf
