= Battle of Tianmenling =

Battle between ancient Korean and Chinese kingdoms

Date	698
Location	Tianmenling, Jilin
Result	Mohe-Goguryeo victory: Establishment of the Parhae Kingdom

Belligerents
Zhou	Goguryeo migrants Sumo Mohe; Baishan Mohe

Commanders and leaders
Li Kaigu	Dae Jo-yeong; Geolsa Biu †

The Battle of Tianmenling (Chinese: 天門嶺之戰), or the Battle of Cheonmun-ryeong in Korean (Korean: 천문령 전투), was fought between Dae Jo-yeong, later founder of Parhae, and Li Kaigu (李楷固), a Khitan commander of the Chinese Tang dynasty and Wu Zhou dynasty.

After the fall of the Korean kingdom of Goguryeo to the Silla-Tang armies, Dae Jo-yeong, along with his father Dae Jung-sang, were forced to move over into the Yingzhou province of Tang. In the confusion of the Khitan uprising against the Zhou in May 696, Dae Jung-sang and the Baishan Mohe leader Geolsa Biu sought independence from Zhou. In spite of Empress Wu Zetian's appeasement policy, they fled eastward to the former land of Goguryeo.

The Zhou sent general Li Kaigu to give chase, and subsequently Geolsa Biu and Dae Jung-sang were killed. Dae Jo-yeong integrated the Goguryeo people under the two leaders and resisted the Tang's attack. He scored a victory over the Zhou at the Battle of Tianmenling, which enabled him to establish his own kingdom. Dae jo yeong claimed himself the King of Jin in 699 and put his capital at Dongmo Mountain, in the south of today's Jilin province.
