= Im Hyuk =

South Korean actor

- Born: Im Jung-hyuk; May 31, 1949 (age 77); South Korea
- Education: Chung-Ang University - Theater and Film
- Occupation: Actor
- Years active: 1969–present

Korean name
- Hangul: 임혁
- RR: Im Hyeok
- MR: Im Hyŏk

Birth name
- Hangul: 임정혁
- RR: Im Jeonghyeok
- MR: Im Chŏnghyŏk

Im Hyuk (born Im Jung-hyuk; May 31, 1949) is a South Korean actor. Im has starred in television series since 1969, notably in historical dramas.

== Filmography ==
=== Television series ===
Year	Title	Role	Notes/Ref.
1976	Haeng-un's Door		KBS1
1979	The Path of Sacraments - "A Genius Who Lost His Wings"	Yi Sang	KBS1
1979	The Path of Sacraments - "Sky, Wind, Stars and Poetry"	Yun Dong-ju	KBS1
1979	The Path to Sacraments - "Master Wonhyo"	Wonhyo	KBS1
1980	A Mountain Stroll	Husband	MBC
1982	Mrs. Swan		KBS2
1982	Pung-un	King Cheoljong	KBS1
1982	Milbong (Sealed)		KBS1
1982	Gaeseong Merchant		KBS2
1982	Two Days of Summer		KBS2
1983	Comrades		KBS1
1983	Foundation of the Kingdom	King Gongmin	KBS1
1983	The Longhorn Beetle		KBS1
1983	Hakchum		KBS1
1983	The Descendants of Cain		KBS1
1983	Apocalypse		KBS1
1983	Heaven Only Knows		KBS1
1983	Now in Pyongyang		KBS1
1984	People from the Swamp		KBS1
1984	Independence Gate	An Yeong-bo	KBS1
1984	Let's Meet Again Someday		KBS1
1984	Acting Class		KBS1
1984	Fascinating Homecoming		KBS1
1984	Audible Light		KBS1
1985	A Life-sized Statue of Buddha	Man-jeok	KBS1
1985	Dawn	Pak Hon-yong	KBS1
1986	Gilson	Song Man-ri	KBS2
1986	The Mind of a Woman	Park Deok-dae	KBS2
1986	Hot River	Kang Joon-seok	KBS2
1986	25th Hour Detective	Chief inspector	KBS2
1987	Pearl Tower		KBS1
1988	Three Women	Jin Won-seok	KBS2
1989	Giant	Prosecutor Jo Tae-jin	MBC
1990	500 Years of Joseon - "Daewongun	Kim Byung-gi	MBC
1991	The Royal Path	Hong In-han	KBS1
1992	The Three Kingdoms	Yang Manchun	KBS1
1992	Red Zone	Oh Tae-min	KBS2
1993	Daybreak	Park Seung-hak	KBS1
1994	Han Myung-hoi	Noh Sa-sin	KBS2
1994	Close One Eye		KBS2
1994	A Toast from an Empty Cup		KBS1
1994	Rivals in History	Wonhyo	KBS1
1995	Dazzling Dawn	Okumura Ensin	KBS1
1995	West Palace	Yu Yeong-gyeong	KBS2
1996	Living Tomb		KBS2
1996	Project		KBS2
1996	Sword	Park Soon-chan	KBS2
1996	Tears of the Dragon	Ha Ryun	KBS1
1996	Then That Incident		KBS1
1998	The King and the Queen	Im Sa-hong	KBS1
1999	Tyrant	Kang Dae-woo	KBS2
1999	Gumiho 3	Kang Il-du	KBS2
2000	KBS TV Novel: - "Admonitions on Governing the People"	Sim Hwan-ji	KBS2
2001	Ladies of the Palace	Kat Pa-chi	SBS
2001	Empress Myeongseong	Miura Gorō	KBS2
2003	Age of Warriors	Du Gyeong-seung	KBS1
2003	The King's Woman	Yi Yi-cheom	SBS
2005	Shin Don	Bo-u	MBC
2006	Dae Jo-yeong	Dae Jung-sang	KBS1
2008	Strongest Chil Woo	Kim Ja-seon	KBS2
2009	Empress Cheonchu	Seo Hui	KBS2
2010	The Great Merchant		KBS1
2010	Giant	Baek Pa/Choi Yeol	
2011	New Tales of Gisaeng	Ah Soo-ra	
2012	Dream of the Emperor	Alcheon	
2012	The King of Dramas	Loan shark	Cameo
2013	Princess Aurora	Seol Seol-guk	
2015	The Jingbirok: A Memoir of Imjin War	Gwak Jae-u	
2016	Jang Yeong-sil	Yoo Taek-sang	
2023	Woman in a Veil	Nam Man-joong	

=== Film ===
Year	Title	Role
1982	Tanya	
1984	The King's Poison	Grand Prince Anpyeong
1985	Ohsing	Oh-sing's father
1986	No Woman Is Afraid of the Night	Pi Jeong-deok

== Awards and nominations ==
Year	Award	Category	Nominated work	Result
1981	KBS Drama Awards	Excellence Award, Actor		Won
2007	KBS Drama Awards	Best Supporting Actor	Dae Jo-yeong	Won
2007	10th Myeongin Awards	Recipient, Acting category		Won
2010	Proud Korean Awards	Recipient		Won
2011	SBS Drama Awards	Special Award, Actor in a Serial Drama	New Tales of Gisaeng	Nominated
