= Li Kaigu =

Li Kaigu (李楷固), also known as Wu Kaigu (武楷固) from 700 to 705, formally the Duke of Yan (燕公), was a general during the reign of Wu Zetian. He was of Khitan ethnicity.

== Career ==
In 696, the Khitan rose against Chinese hegemony under the leadership of Li Jinzhong and his brother-in-law Sun Wanrong. At the time, Li Kaigu was a general under Li Jinzhong. By 697 Li Jinzhong had died and Sun had been defeated and killed. Li Kaigu and fellow Khitan general Luo Wuzheng (駱務整) surrendered to Wu Zetian's Zhou Dynasty. Initially, Zhou generals wanted to put Li Kaigu and Luo Wuzheng to death in retaliation for their victories over Zhou forces, but the chancellor Di Renjie intervened and persuaded Wu Zetian to make them her generals.

Li Kaigu was subsequently able to suppress the remaining Khitan forces. In 700, Li Kaigu was named Duke of Yan and subsequently took the surname "Wu". (Presumably, he changed his surname back to "Li" after Wu Zetian's son, Emperor Zhongzong of the Tang Dynasty, returned to the throne in 705 following a coup that restored the Dynasty).

Li Kaigu was unable to defeat Dae Jo-yeong, who eventually established the kingdom of Balhae. Li Kaigu's date of death is unknown. The famous Tang general Li Guangbi was a grandson of Li Kaigu through his daughter.

== Battle of Tianmenling ==
The Battle of the Astronomical Battle or the Battle of the Tiananmen Ling took place in 698 between the Gaoqing Daojongong and the Tang Dynasty.

After the destruction of Goguryeo by Silla and the coalition forces of the party, Dae Joo - young went to the lord of the party with his father. In May of 696, when Lee Jing-Chong and Son-Man-榮ong of Rebellion revolted in the Tang dynasty, they were caught up in the confusion. Then, in spite of the emancipation policy of Huan Teng Wu, Goguryeo created a force in the east.

The Tang Dynasty sent an armed force. Dae Joo-young defeated them by rallying gunwale, a group of people from the Malgalese and Goguryeo. Dae defeated them in the royal court and laid the foundations for establishing the Bohai Sea. In AD 698, Dae built the pavilion under the Dongmoo-san in Jilin castle.

== In popular culture ==
- Portrayed by Jeong Bo-seok in 2006–2007 KBS TV series Dae Jo Yeong.

== See also ==
- Li Jinzhong
- Sun Wanrong
- Balhae
- Go of Balhae
- Tang
- Wu Zetian
