= Kŏlsa Piu =

Balhae military leader (fl. 7th century)

Chinese name
- Traditional Chinese: 乞四比羽
Transcriptions
Standard Mandarin
- Hanyu Pinyin: Qǐsì Bǐyǔ

Korean name
- Hangul: 걸사비우
- Hanja: 乞四比羽
Transcriptions
- Revised Romanization: Geolsa Biu
- McCune–Reischauer: Kŏlsa Piu

Kŏlsa Piu (Korean: 걸사비우; Hanja: 乞四比羽), also rendered as Qisi Biyu, was a 7th-century military leader of Baishan Mohe ancestry. Kŏlsa Piu took an active part in Balhae's effort for autonomy against the Tang dynasty. Kŏlsa Piu died in the Battle of Tianmenling, in which Balhae achieved victory and declared autonomy.

== In popular culture ==
- Portrayed by Choi Cheol-ho in the 2006-2007 KBS TV series Dae Jo-yeong.

== See also ==
- Baishan Mohe
- Balhae
- Tae Chungsang
- Go of Balhae
