= Helmet and spurs of Saint Olaf =

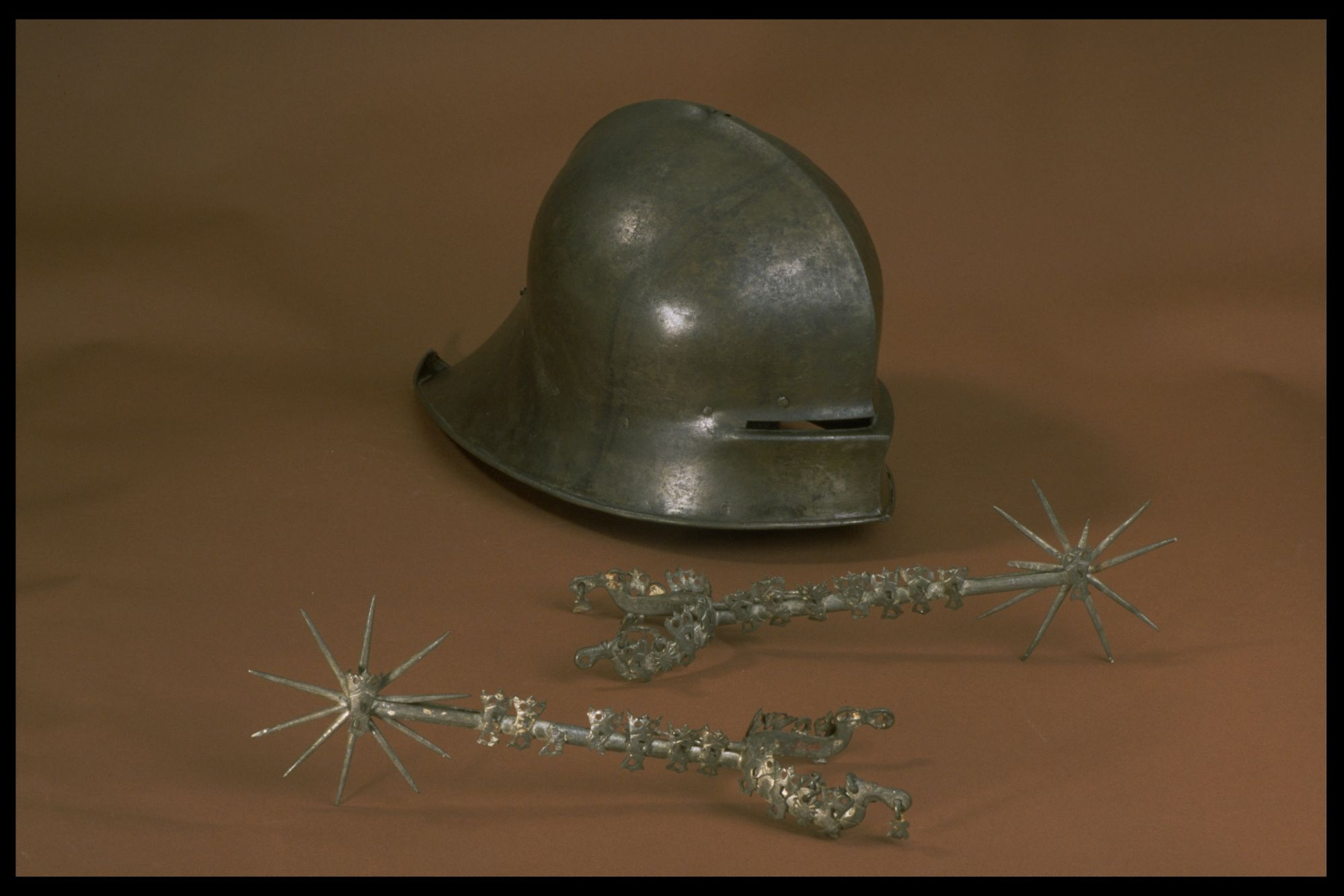
The helmet and spurs of Saint Olaf in the collections of the Swedish History Museum.

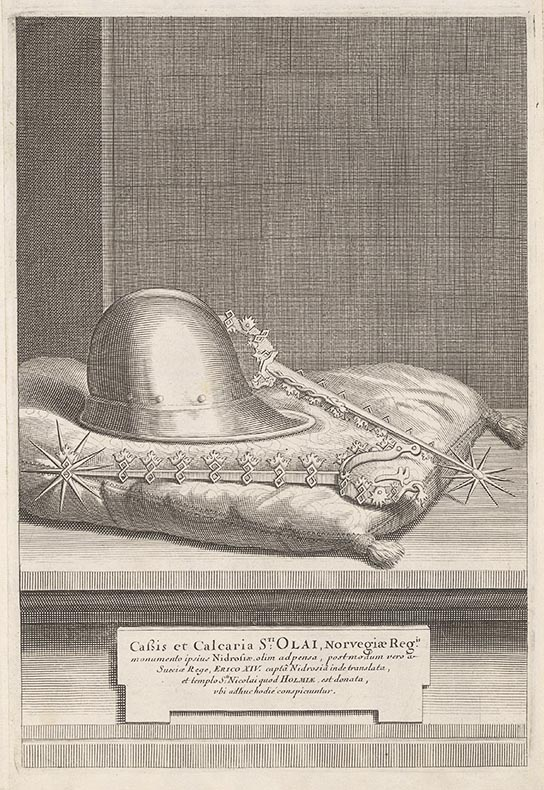
The helmet and spurs as depicted in Suecia antiqua et hodierna.

The helmet and spurs of Saint Olaf are the oldest preserved war trophies taken by Sweden. They were taken as loot in 1564 during the Northern Seven Years' War from Trondheim by Claude Collart, an army commander in service of Eric XIV of Sweden.

== History ==
The supposed relics are not from St. Olaf's own time (11th century), but have been dated to the last quarter of the 15th century. The helmet, a so-called sallet, was probably made in Flanders or southern Germany. The spurs are assumed to have been manufactured in Denmark.

Their early history is unknown, but Bengt Thordeman, who would later become head of the Swedish National Heritage Board, assumed that they were kept in Nidaros Cathedral (the burial church of the saint) until the Reformation. After that, they were probably kept at Steinvikholm Castle, where the soldiers under Collart's command seized them in 1564.

When they arrived in Stockholm, the trophies were donated to Storkyrkan, Stockholm's main church. In the 1660s they were favoured with being illustrated in Suecia antiqua et hodierna, the main propaganda publication of the Swedish Empire. Only a few items were illustrated in the book which mostly contains depictions of cities and buildings. In 1866 the items were deposited in the Swedish History Museum.
