= Dae Jo-yeong (TV series) =

South Korean television series

- Promotional poster
- Hangul: 대조영
- Hanja: 大祚榮
- RR: Dae Joyeong
- MR: Tae Choyŏng
- Genre: Historical
- Written by: Jang Young-chul
- Directed by: Kim Jong-sun; Yoon Sung-sik
- Starring: Choi Soo-jong; Lee Deok-hwa; Jeong Bo-seok; Park Ye-jin; Hong Soo-hyun; Im Hyuk; Choi Cheol-ho; Kim Hak-cheol
- Music by: Lee Pil-ho (Music Director)
- Country of origin: South Korea
- Original language: Korean
- No. of episodes: 134

Production
- Executive producer: Lee Sung Joo (KBS) Go Young Tak Kim Myung Wook Moon Bo Hyun
- Producer: Jung Young Chul
- Running time: 50 minutes
- Production company: KBS Self-production
- Budget: ₩ 35 billion

Original release
- Network: KBS 1TV
- Release: September 16, 2006 – December 23, 2007

Dae Jo-yeong (Korean: 대조영) is a South Korean television series aired from September 16, 2006, to December 23, 2007, on KBS1.

Filmed at Hanwha Resort near the mountain Seoraksan with a budget of 35 billion won, it was a critical and ratings success. It was originally planned as a 100-episode series, but was extended by 34 episodes.

== Overview of the plot ==
=== Early ===
The drama begins during a war between Tang and Goguryeo in 645 before Dae Jo-yeong is born. Dae Jung-sang, Dae Jo-yeong's father is introduced as a general. We are also introduced to Xue Rengui (Seol Ingui in Korean), a man with a brilliant mind who comes up with a plan to bring down Liaodong Fortress. After a failed attempt to assassinate the Tang emperor Li Shimin, Jungsang is captured by Tang. Seol, enraged for not receiving credit for his actions, frees him. Dae leaves Seol to himself, and heads to Ansi Fortress. Thereafter, Seol rescues some Tang soldiers about to be killed. He catches the emperor's eye and is promoted to the rank of general.

The emperor, meanwhile, begins plans for making a mountain of earth in order to deliberately destroy the fortress. Dae Jo-yeong's mother, Dalgi, comes up with the plan to dig under the mountain as it is being built. She is already pregnant with Dae Jo-yeong. As the battle begins, Tang's million men come onto the mountain. The order is given and water is released through the tunnel underneath the mountain, causing it to collapse and it crushes hundreds of thousands of Tang soldiers. Dae Jo-yeong was born during this time.

When Dae Jo-yeong is born in 645, a prophecy says that he will become a king. Naturally, this is seen as treachery because there is already a king. So his father flees from the Supreme Commander Yeon Gaesomun, who wishes to kill the baby, only to be captured as his wife and son try to escape on a raft. She is later found and captured by the Supreme Commander as well.

The Supreme Commander intended to kill them at first but when General Yang Manchun tells him that perhaps the heavens sent Dae Jo-yeong to protect their country after they die, he changes his mind. General Dae Jungsang is told his wife and son are dead and ordered to command Goryeo Fortress. His wife is ordered to never communicate with her son, or be killed along with him.

Dae Jo-yeong is raised by Yeon Gaesomun, the Supreme Commander of Goguryeo as a slave and is called Gaedong (dog boy) so he wouldn't question why he is a slave and discover who he was with his real name. As a child he is often shown running away from the Supreme Commander's estate and trying to find his parents, although not knowing his parents are alive since the Supreme Commander constantly tells him that his parents are dead.

Dae Jo-yeong teaches himself to read and fight. He also (when he grown up in 660) begs the Supreme Commander's eldest son (Yeon Namsaeng) to allow him to join the martial arts contest because the reward is emancipation (freedom), but he refuses. When he hears Namseng say that he would accept anyone who had a recommendation from the Grand Martial General Yang Manchun, he runs away to Ansi Fortress and impresses Yang Manchun, who wonders if he is Dae Jungsang's son.

Dae Jo-yeong tells Yang Manchun that he is a slave and that he wants to be a warrior. Yang Manchun, not wanting to hurt him by letting him think he has a chance, tells him to fight the best fighter (Geol sabiu) in Yodong Fort. He surprises everyone and is about to smash the Geol Sa-Biwoo's head with a rock when General Yang Manchun stops the fight. He asks Dae-Joyeong why he would try cheating and he replies that in a fight, there are no rules, since for him this fight is worth more than his life.

Later, Yang Manchun gives him a recommendation, but when Dae Jo-yeong returns to Pyongyang and gives the recommendation to Yeon Gaesomun, Yeon Gaesomun angrily rips it up and says that no one can stop Dae Joyeong from entering the contest now except for him. Dae Jo-yeong is flogged and returns to being a slave. On the day of the contest, he desperately tries to sneak in one last time, but gets caught and thrown into a barn.

During this time, the princess, King Bojang's niece Sukyeong dresses up as a soldier to watch the contest. Meanwhile, at the Pyongyang palace, a Tang envoy (Seol Ingui) arrives and causes mischief by offering a peace treaty, in which a princess from Goguryeo and a prince from Tang are to marry. Yeon Gaesomun instantly rejects it and forces the civil officials to reject it too, but Seol had not come for the peace treaty, but for a chance to assassinate Yeon Gaesomun, who is one of the pillars of the country. Seol teams up with Bu Kiwon, one of the civil officials, and hires some assassins to kill Yeon Gaesomun.

Right before the contest begins the assassins go to the same barn Dae Jo-yeong was locked in to form a plan (each of their swords are laced with a deadly poison). Dae Jo-yeong hears them talking and figures out what they are up to, but he then makes a tiny noise which immediately catches the assassins' attention. One of the assassins tells the others to go ahead since the martial arts contest was beginning and stays to take care of Dae Jo-yeong. The princess enters the barn, and the assassin is about to kill her. Dae Jo-yeong is able to save the princess and knock out the assassin. When Sukyeong tries to prevent him from leaving, as she thinks that he is the assassin, he knocks her out. The assassination attempt fails, thanks to Dae Jo-yeong, but he is cut by one of the poisoned blades and falls unconscious. Yeon Gaesomun immediately orders a royal doctor to heal him.

=== Middle ===
The war between Tang and Goguryeo took place in 661 – 662. Dae Jo-yeong eventually goes to find his father at Goryeo Fortress. Dae Jo-yeong doesn't tell Dae Jung-sang at first, but in the end, they reconcile and return to Goguryeo. On the way, they meet Mimosa, a Baekje citizen. In that time, Dae Jo-yeong runs into the Khitans and meets Chulin (Chorin in Korean), a Khitan princess, and Li Kaigu (Li Haego in Korean), a Khitan general. Li Kaigu soon becomes Dae Joyeong's greatest rival. Li Kaigu has feelings for Chulin, who falls in love with Dae Joyeong. Dae Jo-yeong gave a hand in the victory of Goguryeo in 662. Goguryeo falls in 668 with the deaths of Yeon Gaesomun and Yang Manchun in 666. Dae Jo-yeong does everything in his effort to save Goguryeo, but Bu Kiwon, Sa Bugu and other Goguryeo ministers, with the Tang and Khitan armies, are able to destroy it. Dae Jo-yeong, with his subordinates Geol Sabiwu and Heuk Sudol, set off to rescue the refugees and, with some surviving Goguryeo officials, makes a second Goguryeo from 669 to 674. Dae Jo-yeong gets Chulin pregnant in 674, but only Chulin knows. Dae Jo-yeong is nearly killed by Li Kaigu, Geolsa Biu is captured by Tang, and the second Goguryeo is destroyed after a Silla-aided coup d'état in 674. Li Kaigu takes in Dae Jo-yeong's son as his own. Only Chulin, Geolsa Biu, and Li Kaigu know that Chulin's son, named Geom, is Dae Jo-yeong's son.

Dae Jo-yeong plans to make the second Goguryeo. He tries many things, buying help Mimosa and his subordinate Geumlan, and building a new organization, Dong Myeong Cheon Ki Gae Tse (in 677) that is brought to kill the enemies that brought Goguryeo down. They are aided by the former Goguryeo king, Bojang. Sa Bugu was killed in 678, Shin Sung was killed in 679 and Bu Kiwon was killed in 680. However, this organization is felled by Li Kaigu and Xue Rengui in 681. Even as this organization falls, Dae Joyeong and his followers refuse to give up restoring Gorguryeo.

Dae Jo-yeong acquires two subordinates of Göktürk descent, Gaepilsamun and Tungso. While in battle, to rescue the people captured in the collapse of the Dong Myeong Cheon Ki Gae Tse, Dae Jo-yeong and Heuk Sudol are captured by the Chinese commander Li Wen in 681, who hates Dae Jo-yeong with all of his heart. They suffer many hardships, including being forced to fight Wugol, a giant, after being starved for six days but Dae Jo-yeong eventually unites the slaves to fight against the Chinese. During this time, he meets Ashina Muchou, who eventually becomes Khan of the Göktürks. Dae Jo-yeong survives by pledging allegiance to China and then fleeing to the lands of Goguryeo. There he begins to build up Goguryeo. Dae Jo-yeong has married Suk-yong in 681, King Bojang's niece. In China, Empress Wu Zetian has risen to the throne.

Fifteen years later, the Khitans rebel from the Tang in 696, and Dae Jo-yeong comes to aid the Khitans; in exchange, they ask for all of the thousands of Goguryeo refugees living in the Khitan country. During this time, his tensions with Li Kaigu get bigger and bigger. Dae Jo-yeong also meets his son Geom and works with him. Li Kaigu is captured, but Dae Joyeong saves him by capturing Li Wen and making a deal with Xue Rengui. Dae Jo-yeong took over Shin Seong, Liaodong, Beakam and Ansi of Wu Zetian in the east. Li Kaigu took over 9 cities of Wu Zetian in the west. Eventually, the reigning king, Li Jinzhong, is assassinated, and the war ends. Dae Joyeong takes the Goguryeo refugees home.

The Khitan country is nearly destroyed by a Tang-Göktürk alliance in 697, but the few defenders are rescued by Dae Jo-yeong, after he finds out that Geom is his son. Geom, and nearly everyone else, have been aware of this before. When Li Kaigu flees from Dae Jo-yeong, Dae Jo Yeong nearly kills Li Kaigu, and the Khitans are destroyed. Li Kaigu survives and goes to Tang to become a commander, trading his own eye to show he would be loyal to not only Xue Rengui, but also Tang. Dae Jo-yeong is leading the last of the refugees and all of his army from Ansi, Liaodong, Baekham and Shin Seong to his base in Mount Dong-mo, where he intends to create a new Goguryeo. Li Kaigu is assigned the leading role.

While they are going, the Tang army catches up in 698. Heuk Sudol and Gaepilsamun stay behind to delay the army. Gaepilsamun was killed by Li Kaigu's arrows, and Heuk Sudol stays to avenge him, but was killed by Zhao Renshi (Jo Insa), a Tang commander. The refugees are safe, but Dae Jo-yeong sets up Cheonmunryeong Hill as a huge battlefield for him. The Khitan force under Chulin and Geom cannot block the Tang advance. Dae Jo-yeong kills Zhao Renshi in an act to avenge his brother, Heuk Sudol. Geumlan was killed by arrows, and Dae Jung-sang is captured. Dae Jung-sang is killed, and that fuels the morale of the Goguryeo-Mohe army so much that out of 30,000 Tang soldiers to enter, less than 1000 leave.

=== Last ===
Dae Jo-yeong wins Li Kaigu and Xue Rengui's forces at Cheonmunryeong with help of Malgal Tribe. Li Kaigu runs away from Dae but Dae finds him. Li Kaigu sends his message that he will like to battle with him. Dae Jo-yeong manages to win after a fierce fight even he is the first one to get hurt. Chulin drinks a poisoned potion after seeing Li Kaigu die. After their deaths, Dae Jo-yeong builds the new Gorguryeo in 698 and names the country, Balhae. When Dae thinks all is over, Mimosa comes and says it isn't as Tang can go to Gokturks and persuade them to attack Balhae and the only way to stop is to enter with friendly relations with Gokturks, send people faster than Tang. Jo-yeong sends Geom to Gokturks tribe. As Mimosa has expected, Li Wen of Tang (to get Gokturks in Tang's group with a mind to perish Balhae with them) arrives after a few moments after Geom has arrived. Geom is the one who succeeds, beating Li Wen (although there are many things Balhae must fulfill for Gokturks). Dae Jo-yeong thinks all the things settled down and makes up rules.

Soon, Gokturks attack Tang in 698 and 701 and Balhae helps Gokturks as they demanded military support from Balhae. Tang almost loses so Li Wen thinks that the only way to survive is to send Dae Jo-yeong a peace treaty. Empress Wu Zetian is angry at this and hesitant over it but at last agrees, thinking of what's good for Tang. They send Dae Jo Yeong a peace treaty between them (enter into friendly relations) in 705. Dae Jo-yeong agrees on condition that Tang should give Liaodong to Balhae. They agree although there were some harsh things to get them agree.

Then Dae Jo-yeong starts to think about who will succeed him. He has two sons in mind, Geom and Dan-ni, but cannot make up his mind although he has Geom more in mind. (Dan-ni is Suk-yeong's son so has the last Goguryeo royal blood while Geom has the blood of the Khitan tribe, through his mother Chulin; but Geom demonstrates unusual talent, leadership abilities, and intelligence). Finally Geom decides to leave the country, thinking that if he stays there will be dissension among Dae Jo Yeong's followers about the succession. He tells Geol Sabiwu what he wants most is to be close to Jo Yeong, but if they try to make him the successor he will take his own life.

Dae comes to see Geom and finds him writing a farewell letter. He tries to stop him, saying "Don't go..." and blurts out the word he always wanted to say to Geom, "Son..." Geom, hearing the word, "Son", melts in tears and also uses the word he always wanted to say to Dae, "Father..." (Geom is actually Dae and Chu-lin's son but since he was born a Khitan Chulin knew he would be in danger as Dae was Khitan's enemy at that time. Li Kaigu, who was one of Khitan's greatest warriors and had loved Chu-lin for a long time, offered to protect mother and son and raise Geom as his own. Eventually Geom discovered the truth, and so did Dae Jo Yeong, but they couldn't acknowledge the truth openly.) Geom and Jo Yeong embrace each other sadly as son and father then Geom rides off to an unknown destiny.

The drama ends with a scene where Dae Jo-yeong, with his royal procession, visits the Gwanggaeto Stele in 719. He and his original remaining followers, Geolsa Biu and Mimosa, bow before it, promising that never again will their people suffer as they have in the past. In June 719, Dae Jo-yeong died.

== Cast ==
=== Balhae ===
- Choi Soo-jong as Gaedong / Dae Jo-yeong, later Go of Balhae he was adopted by Supreme Commander General Yeon Gaesomun and named him Gaedong. He grew up as a serf without knowing his real parents.
- Hong Soo-hyun as Suk-yeong

Dae Jo-yeong's wife, later Queen of Balhae.

- Im Hyuk as Dae Jung-sang

Dae Jo-yeong's father. He was sent to Goryeo Fort away from his wife and son after a long years but reunited when Gaedong found out from his mother his real identity.

- Kim Seok as Dae Dan (Dae Muye)

Dae Jo-yeong's eldest son, later Mu of Balhae.
(Kim Seok also as a young Goguryeo soldier who died in battle of Baekbing mount).

- Choi Cheol-ho as Geolsa Biu

A Mohe and sworn brother of Dae Jo-yeong.

- Kim Hak-cheol as Heuksudol

A sworn brother of Dae Jo-yeong.

- Kim Jeong-hyeon as Mimosa

He was from Baekje and later became Chief tactician of Dae Jo-yeong.

- Shim Eun-jin as Geum-ran

Adopted sister of Mimosa; later become a meritorious retainer of Balhae. She died saving Geolsabiwu.

- Yoon Yong-hyeon as Gyepil Samun

Leader of Göktürks. He was dubbed as "Wolf of Mt. Madu". He was killed by Tang soldiers with an arrow while luring their enemies at the ravine.

- Bang Hyeong-ju as Tungso

Göktürks' general and follower of Gyepil Samun.

- Im Seon-taek as Jang San-hae

Civil official (appointed as Prime Minister) of Balhae and follower of Dae Jung-sang.

- Jang Sun-guk as Dolbal

Dae Jung-sang's younger brother and general.

- Shin Won-gyun as Mu Yeom

Dae Jung-sang's subordinate officer, later general of Balhae.

- Im Chae-won as Auhong

Heuksudol's wife.

=== Goguryeo ===
- Kim Jin-tae as Yeon Gaesomun

Generalissimo of Goguryeo. He adopted and raised Joyoung as a lowly serf.

- Im Dong-jin as Yang Manchun

The lord of Ansi Fortress. Murdered by Bu Giwon's collaborators.

- Kil Yong-woo as King Bojang

28th and last King of Goguryeo. He also founded the Dongmyeongchun League.

- Kim Ha-gyun as Bu Giwon

Former chancellor of Goguryeo, collaborator of Tang. Killed by Dae Joyoung as the Leader of Dongmyeongchun League.

=== Tang ===
- Lee Deok-hwa as Xue Rengui

General of Tang.

- Ryu Tae-seul as Hong Pei

Xue Rengui's right-hand man.

- Song Yong-tae as Emperor Taizong of Tang
- Yang Geum-seok as Wu Zetian
- Nam Seong-jin as Li Wen

General of Tang, later follower of Xue Rengui.

- Jeon Hyeon as Wu Chengsi

Chancellor of Tang and Wu Zetian's nephew.

=== Khitans ===
- Park Ye-jin as Chulin

Daughter of Khan Li Jinzhong.

- Jeong Bo-seok as Li Kaigu

Chief general and Chulin's husband. Archenemy of Dae Jo-yeong. He was killed at Liaodong Fort by Jo-yeong).

- Kim Dong-hyeon as Li Jinzhong

First Khan of Khitans. Later became allies with Dae Jo-yeong.

- Cho In-pyo as Sun Wanrong

Second Khan of Khitans. He was held captive and killed by Tang at Liadong Fort.

- Kim Kyu-chul as Shinhong

Tactician of Li Kaigu. He was killed by Dae Jo-yeong.

- Lee Dal-hyeong as Xue Jietou

Follower of Li Kaigu.

- Hwang Taek-ha as Mou Jie

Another follower of Li Kaigu, later Geom's.

- Jung Tae-woo as Li Geom

Chulin and Dae Jo-yeong's son, believed to be Li Kaigu's.

=== Göktürks ===
- Kang Jae-ik as Muchuo Khan

Khan of Göktürks. He was first met by Dae Joyoung at Mt. Guifu as a prisoner.

- Lee Yeong-ho as Inäl

Prince of Göktürks.

- Kim Seong-hun as Tonyukuk

General and facilitator of Göktürks.

- Kim Jong Kook as Bilge

Prince of Göktürks.

- Ham Suk-hoon as Kul Tigin

Prince of Göktürks.

== Ratings ==
Episode #	Original broadcast date	TNmS Ratings	AGB Nielsen
Episode #	Original broadcast date	Nationwide	
1	16 September 2006	11.9%	12.6%
2	17 September 2006	16.6%	16.0%
3	23 September 2006	13.4%	13.6%
4	24 September 2006	16.2%	16.9%
5	30 September 2006	16.4%	16.3%
6	1 October 2006	17.6%	18.7%
7	7 October 2006	14.4%	15.9%
8	8 October 2006	21.6%	22.5%
9	14 October 2006	19.9%	19.2%
10	15 October 2006	23.4%	23.2%
11	21 October 2006	20.7%	20.2%
12	22 October 2006	22.6%	23.9%
13	28 October 2006	22.1%	23.0%
14	29 October 2006	23.9%	24.3%
15	4 November 2006	21.2%	20.1%
16	5 November 2006	23.3%	24.7%
17	11 November 2006	19.6%	19.8%
18	12 November 2006	24.1%	23.3%
19	18 November 2006	20.7%	22.5%
20	19 November 2006	26.1%	26.9%
21	25 November 2006	19.1%	22.3%
22	26 November 2006	23.9%	25.8%
23	2 December 2006	21.5%	22.3%
24	3 December 2006	23.6%	24.7%
25	9 December 2006	18.9%	20.4%
26	10 December 2006	23.5%	23.6%
27	16 December 2006	19.5%	21.4%
28	17 December 2006	22.3%	23.9%
29	23 December 2006	18.4%	20.8%
30	24 December 2006	18.8%	21.3%
31	30 December 2006	19.8%	22.2%
32	31 December 2006	17.4%	19.9%
33	6 January 2007	20.2%	24.5%
34	7 January 2007	23.0%	25.9%
35	13 January 2007	15.2%	19.7%
36	14 January 2007	20.5%	22.9%
37	20 January 2007	20.7%	23.8%
38	21 January 2007	22.0%	25.9%
39	27 January 2007	18.9%	21.2%
40	28 January 2007	20.2%	24.1%
41	3 February 2007	20.3%	23.3%
42	4 February 2007	20.9%	23.7%
43	10 February 2007	19.6%	21.6%
44	11 February 2007	21.6%	25.7%
45	17 February 2007	15.5%	18.9%
46	18 February 2007	15.6%	17.2%
47	24 February 2007	20.7%	23.1%
48	25 February 2007	21.7%	25.8%
49	3 March 2007	19.0%	19.1%
50	4 March 2007	22.7%	25.0%
51	10 March 2007	19.8%	21.4%
52	11 March 2007	22.6%	26.5%
53	17 March 2007	21.7%	22.9%
54	18 March 2007	26.0%	27.3%
55	24 March 2007	20.1%	21.3%
56	25 March 2007	29.4%	29.7%
57	31 March 2007	26.9%	27.5%
58	1 April 2007	28.5%	30.3%
59	7 April 2007	23.1%	25.7%
60	8 April 2007	27.0%	29.5%
61	14 April 2007	22.5%	24.3%
62	15 April 2007	25.9%	26.7%
63	21 April 2007	22.6%	26.6%
64	22 April 2007	26.5%	29.4%
65	28 April 2007	22.4%	24.9%
66	29 April 2007	25.7%	28.6%
67	5 May 2007	22.1%	25.6%
68	6 May 2007	26.9%	29.1%
69	12 May 2007	24.0%	26.7%
70	13 May 2007	28.4%	30.6%
71	19 May 2007	22.0%	25.1%
72	20 May 2007	25.1%	29.5%
73	26 May 2007	24.3%	27.7%
74	27 May 2007	29.2%	32.7%
75	2 June 2007	23.6%	26.0%
76	3 June 2007	28.0%	31.9%
77	9 June 2007	25.5%	28.0%
78	10 June 2007	28.3%	31.0%
79	16 June 2007	23.0%	26.7%
80	17 June 2007	30.1%	32.5%
81	23 June 2007	25.7%	28.0%
82	24 June 2007	30.1%	30.9%
83	30 June 2007	25.1%	27.9%
84	1 July 2007	29.5%	33.0%
85	7 July 2007	26.6%	27.5%
86	8 July 2007	30.0%	30.8%
87	14 July 2007	28.6%	28.4%
88	15 July 2007	24.5%	26.2%
89	21 July 2007	28.6%	29.5%
90	22 July 2007	28.4%	28.6%
91	28 July 2007	22.4%	23.5%
92	29 July 2007	32.1%	31.9%
93	4 August 2007	27.9%	28.1%
94	5 August 2007	32.7%	30.8%
95	11 August 2007	29.4%	32.1%
96	12 August 2007	31.9%	34.4%
97	18 August 2007	28.4%	30.0%
98	19 August 2007	31.4%	30.7%
99	25 August 2007	29.1%	29.7%
100	26 August 2007	32.1%	33.5%
101	1 September 2007	30.1%	31.6%
102	2 September 2007	33.2%	33.4%
103	8 September 2007	28.6%	28.7%
104	9 September 2007	33.3%	34.5%
105	15 September 2007	31.9%	29.7%
106	16 September 2007	35.5%	36.2%
107	22 September 2007	28.1%	29.4%
108	23 September 2007	25.8%	29.8%
109	29 September 2007	29.8%	32.6%
110	30 September 2007	32.6%	33.8%
111	6 October 2007	28.3%	30.2%
112	7 October 2007	33.5%	33.3%
113	13 October 2007	29.5%	29.3%
114	14 October 2007	33.6%	34.2%
115	20 October 2007	28.6%	30.4%
116	21 October 2007	33.0%	36.3%
117	27 October 2007	28.9%	30.5%
118	28 October 2007	32.4%	34.4%
119	3 November 2007	27.6%	31.8%
120	4 November 2007	31.0%	33.1%
121	10 November 2007	29.4%	31.7%
122	11 November 2007	31.9%	32.6%
123	17 November 2007	28.5%	31.6%
124	18 November 2007	31.6%	35.3%
125	24 November 2007	29.2%	32.3%
126	25 November 2007	31.1%	34.5%
127	1 December 2007	30.0%	32.1%
128	2 December 2007	31.0%	32.9%
129	8 December 2007	28.9%	31.1%
130	9 December 2007	33.0%	36.8%
131	15 December 2007	30.9%	32.1%
132	16 December 2007	30.1%	32.8%
133	22 December 2007	25.5%	28.1%
134	23 December 2007	30.8%	33.3%
Average		25.1%	26.9%

== Original soundtrack ==
The album of the soundtrack was released on 23 July 2007.

1. Mother's Land (Dae Jo Yeong Main Title) (어머니의 나라 (대조영 Main Title)) – Joo Byung-sun
2. Cutting Through The Winds (바람을 가르며)
3. Prairie (초원)
4. Sorrow (애상(哀想)) – Park Hyo-shin
5. My Way (나의 길) – Go Jin-young
6. Waiting (기다림)
7. Sun Shines Bright (새로운 태양)
8. Coalition (연정)
9. Only You Don't Know (그대만 모르죠) – Narsha
10. Before The Break Up (이별이 오기전에) – Eunwoo, Sung Ho
11. Come After Me (나를 따르라) – J3
12. Dae Jo Yeong (대조영)
13. Millenium Wait (천년의 기다림)
14. Remember of Bohai Sea (발해를 기억하라)
15. Dream of Goguryeo (고구려의 꿈)
16. The Way of Destiny (숙명의 길)
17. Sorrow (비통)
18. Chulin (초린)
19. Another Hope (또다른 희망)

== Awards and nominations ==
Year	Award	Category	Recipient	Result	Ref.
2006	KBS Drama Awards	Excellence Award, Actor	Kim Jin-tae	Won	
2006	KBS Drama Awards	Top Excellence Award, Actor	Choi Soo-jong	Nominated	
2007	KBS Drama Awards	Grand Prize/Daesang	Choi Soo-jong	Won	
2007	KBS Drama Awards	Top Excellence Award, Actor	Lee Deok-hwa	Won	
2007	KBS Drama Awards	Best Supporting Actor	Im Hyuk	Won	
2007	KBS Drama Awards	Best Writer	Jang Young-chul	Won	
2007	KBS Drama Awards	Popularity Award	Jeong Bo-seok	Won	
2007	KBS Drama Awards	Netizen Award	Choi Soo-jong	Won	
2007	KBS Drama Awards	Top Excellence Award, Actress	Park Ye-jin	Nominated	
2007	KBS Drama Awards	Excellence Award, Actor in a Serial Drama	Jeong Bo-seok	Nominated	
2007	KBS Drama Awards	Excellence Award, Actress in a Serial Drama	Yang Geum-seok	Nominated	
2007	KBS Drama Awards	Best Supporting Actor	Choi Cheol-ho	Nominated	
2007	KBS Drama Awards	Best Young Actor	Kim Seok	Nominated	
2008	Korean Broadcasting Awards	Talent Award	Choi Soo-jong	Won	
2008	Korea Drama Awards	Top Excellence Award, Actor	Choi Soo-jong	Won	
2008	Korea Drama Awards	Best Drama	Dae Jo-yeong	Nominated	
