= Chunbun Ancestral Rite =

Annual ritual memorializing Balhae

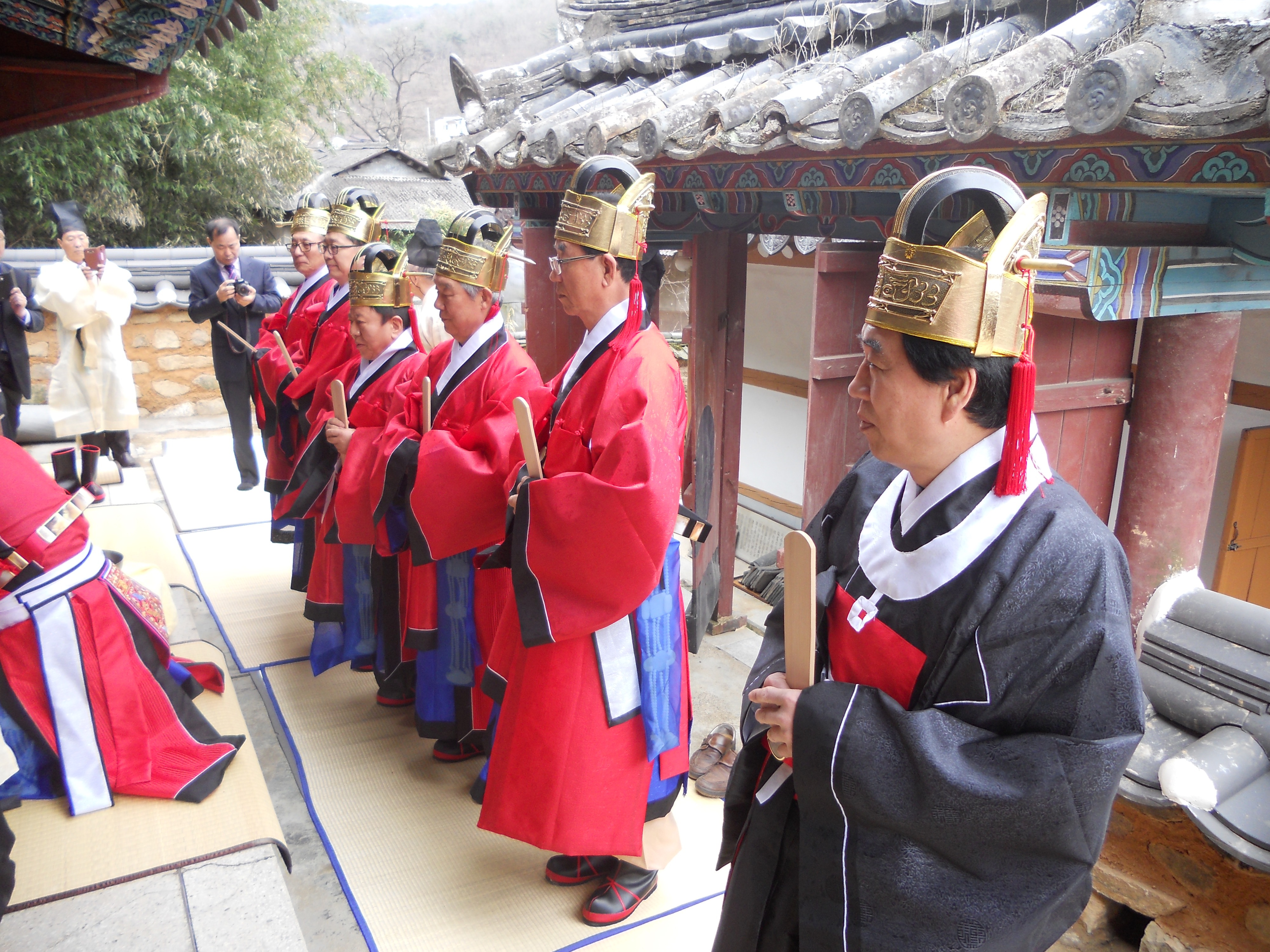
The Chunbun Ancestral Rite, a ritual memorial dedicated to the Go of Balhae.

The Chunbun Ancestral Rite is the annual memorial ritual held during Chunfen, or Chunbun in remembrance of the Go of Balhae, the founder of the Balhae empire. The ancestral rite takes place every year in Balhae Village, a small town located in Gyeongsan, South Korea.

== History ==
The Chunbun Ancestral Rite is a legacy of the Balhae empire, a Northeast Asian state that existed from 698 C.E. to 926 C.E. Balhae has recently begun to receive scholarly attention from the Chinese, Korea, Russian, and the Japanese academia ever since the Chinese government launched the Northeast Project, an endeavor aimed towards amalgamating history of Chinese ethnic minorities under the unified multi-ethnic philosophy. The Chunbun Ancestral Rite is a significant legacy of the Balhae Empire and is also a channel of voice for Korean descendants of the Go of Balhae to contend that Balhae is a part of Korean history. The Chunbun Ancestral Rite is important especially in this context of disputed history.

== Time ==
Chunfen, or Chunbun, refers to the 4th solar term defined by the traditional East Asian calendar, which divides a year into 24 solar terms. Though the exact date varies from year to year, the rite typically takes place on March 20. Supplies needed for the rite are prepared prior to the day of the memorial. The meal preparation for the rite begins in the morning. The memorial ritual is carried out typically at 11 AM. The ritual ends at approximately 1PM. Meals are provided for visitors for free after the memorial is fully over.

== Location ==
- The rite is held in Balhae Village, a small town located in Songbaek-ri, Namcheon-myeon, Gyeongsan, Gyeongsangbuk-do, South Korea.The Balhae village was founded in 1592 before the Japanese invasion of Korea. Sun-geum Tae, the assistant secretary of the Chosun dynasty, spearheaded the establishment of the village. The Tae family has been living in the area since. Today, 30 Tae households (140 people) are residing in the area.
- The rite is held in two shrine buildings simultaneously: the public shrine and the main shrine. The main shrine is immediately behind the public shrine and is located on a small hill. Anyone who wishes to witness the memorial is able to visit and pray in the public shrine but is not able to go into the main shrine where the ritual takes place.

== Procedure ==
1. All Jipsas are requested to walk to the front of the altar and stand facing north.
2. The Chanui is requested to guide memorial ceremony participants to the front of the altar and to stand facing north.
3. Let us hold Chamsillye (Confucius memorial ceremony).
4. All participants of Daeje (Great Rite to Confucius) are requested to bow four times.
5. Chanui is requested to guide all Jipsas to a place designated for washing hands, wash hands, and to go back to the original positions.
6. Daechukkwan is requested to light the candle, enshrine the ancestral tablet, and open the jar.
7. All officiants are requested to bow four times and then straighten up.
8. All participants to Daeje are requested to bow four times and then straighten up.
9. Let us hold the Singwallye.
10. The Alja, a ceremonial guide, is requested to guide the Choheongwan (the first efficient) to a place designated for washing hands, wash hands, walk to Junso, stand facing west, and watch the pouring of the wine.
11. Fill the goblet with wine at Junso.
12. The Alja is requested to guide the Choheongwan to the Spirit Tablet and kneel down.
13. Serve incense three times.
14. Pour the wine in the goblet to the ground.
15. Offer the Pyebaek (cloth).
16. The Daechuk is requested to give the Pebi to the Choheongwan.
17. The Choheongwan is requested to hold the Pyebaek, consecrate it, and give it to the Daechuk.
18. The Daechuk is requested to take the Pebi and offer it in front of the Spirit Tablet.
19. The Choheongwan is requested to prostrate and then straighten up.
20. The Alja is requested to guide the Choheongwanback to the original position.
21. This is the procedure for making offerings.
22. The Chanui is requested to guide the Cheonjoja and the Bongjoja to a place designated for washing hands, wash hands, and walk to the Chanso located outside.
23. Serve the Chan.
24. When the Chanui leads the Cheonjoja and the Bongjoja and enter through the front gate,
25. The Chonjoja is requested to take Sang and the Bongjoja is requested to take Jo while the Daechukgwan is requested to perform Eup (courteous greeting) and greet them at the front gate.
26. The Cheonjoja is requested to walk to the Spirit Tablet and kneel down, and the Bongjoja is requested to take Jo and give it to the Cheonjoja, while kneeling. The Cheonjoja is then requested to take it and give to the Daechukto offer in front of the Spirit Tablet.
27. The Chanui is requested to guide the Cheonjoja and the Bongjoja back to the original position.
28. Alja is requested to guide the Choheongwan to the Junso, stand facing west, and watch the pouring of the wine.
29. The Jipjunja is requested to take the wine and pour it into the Jak(goblet).
30. The Alja is requested to guide the Choheongwan to the Spirit Tablet and kneel down.
31. Take and offer the Jak (goblet).
32. The Choheongwan is requested to prostrate, straighten up, and step back a little and kneel down.
33. AllHeongwans, Jipsas and the Chambanwons are requested to perform Bubok (prostration).
34. The Daechuk is requested to recite the written prayer while kneeling.
35. The Alja is requested to guide the Choheongwanback to the original position.
36. The Alja is requested to guide the Aheongwan to the Junso, stand facing west, and watch the pouring of the wine while standing up.
37. The Jipjunja is requested to take the wine and pour it into the Jak(goblet).
38. The Alja is requested to guide the Aheongwanto the Spirit Tablet and kneel down.
39. Take and offer the Jak (goblet).
40. The Aheongwan is requested to prostrate and then straighten up.
41. The Alja is requested to guide the Aheongwan back to the original position.
42. The Alja is requested to guide the Jongheongwan to the Junso, stand facing west, and watch the pouring of the wine.
43. The Jipjunja is requested to take the wine and pour it into the Jak(goblet).
44. The Alja is requested to guide the Jongheongwan to the front of the Spirit Tablet and kneel down.
45. Take and offer the Jak (goblet).
46. The Choheongwan is requested to prostrate and then straighten up.
47. The Alja is requested to guide the Jongheongwan back to the original position.
48. The Alja is requested to guide the Jongheongwan to the Junso, stand facing west, and watch the pouring of the wine.
49. The Jipjunja is requested to take the wine and pour it into the Jak (goblet).
50. The Alja is requested to guide the Jongheongwan to the front of the Spirit Tablet and kneel down.
51. Take and offer the Jak (goblet).
52. The Bunheongwan is requested to prostrate and then straighten up.
53. The Alja is requested to guide the Bunheongwan back to the original position.
54. The Bongjoja is requested to take Jo while the Bongjakja is requested to take Jak and then to walk to the Eumbokwi.
55. The Alja is requested to guide the Choheongwan to the Eumbokwi, take the Jak(goblet) while sitting down and take Jo (meat for side dish).
56. The Choheongwan is requested to prostrate and then straighten up.
57. The Alja is requested to guide the Choheongwan back to the original position.
58. The Daechuk is requested to gather the Byeon and Du.
59. The Daechukgwan is requested to close the jar and bring the ancestral tablet in.
60. The Alja is requested to guide the Choheongwan up on the Mangnyo and to stand facing north.
61. Burn it.
62. The Daechuk is requested to honor the Chuk, take it to a designated place to burn it.
63. The Alja is requested to guide the Choheongwanback to the original position.
64. The Chanui is requested to guide all Jipsas back to the original positions.
65. All Jipsas are requested to bow four times.
66. The Chanui is requested to inform that the rite has been completed.

== Portrait ==
The official standard portrait of the Go of Balhae has been approved by the Korean government in 2012. The standard portrait is the 86th official portrait approved by the government. Two portraits of the Go of Balhae have been produced so far. One is currently housed by the Museum of Seoul National University. The other is placed in the shrine in Balhae Village. A copy of the portrait is in the “Balhae History Hall” at the Sokcho Municipal Museum.

== See also ==
- Northeast Project of the Chinese Academy of Social Sciences
- Balhae
- Go of Balhae
