= Kim Jin-tae (actor) =

South Korean actor

Kim Jin-tae is a South Korean actor, best known for playing as Yeon Gaesomun in Dae Jo-yeong.

== Filmography ==
- Post of Love (2022) - grandpa
- House of the Rising Sun (1980)
- One Night in an Unfamiliar Place (1980)
- The Single Woman (1979)
- Rainy Day in Autumn (1979)
- The Story of Yellow Village (1979)
- 12 Boarders (1979)
- Sorrow for the Stars (1978)
- The Gate (1978)
- Our Highschool Days (1978)
- Once Upon a Time (1978)
- Tomboys of School (1977)
- March of a Joker (1977)
- Tall Boy and Short Boy (1977)

== Awards ==
- 2006 KBS Drama Awards, Excellence Award, Actor (for playing as Yeon Gaesomun in Dae Jo-yeong)
