= Im Dong-jin =

South Korean actor and pastor (born 1944)

- Born: April 27, 1944 (age 81); Hongwon County, Kankyōnan Province, Korea, Empire of Japan
- Education: Seoul Institute of the Arts – Theater
- Occupations: Actor; pastor
- Years active: 1964–2006; 2015–present
- Spouse: Kwon Mi-hee
- Children: 3

Korean name
- Hangul: 임동진
- Hanja: 林東眞
- RR: Im Dongjin
- MR: Im Tongjin

Im Dong-jin (Korean: 임동진; born April 27, 1944) is a South Korean actor and pastor. He is best known for his roles in historical television series The King and the Queen, King's Woman, Dae Jo-yeong and The Jingbirok: A Memoir of Imjin War.

== Career ==
In 1964, he began his career, first appearing a theatre play. In 1983, he portrayed King Taejo in the drama Foundation of the Kingdom. In 1987, he received the Grand Prize in the inaugural KBS Drama Awards for his role in the drama, The Land. In 1998, he played the lead role of King Sejo in the historical drama, The King and the Queen. In 2003, he began classes at Luther Theological University and graduated in 2006. After playing Yang Manchun in the 2006 TV drama Dae Jo-yeong, Im quit from acting and became the senior pastor at the Open Door Church (Korean: 열린문교회) on May 6, 2006. On December 31, 2014, Im retired as the senior pastor due to the mandatory retirement age of 70 for pastors. In 2015, he returned to acting and portrayed Yun Du-su in the historical drama, The Jingbirok: A Memoir of Imjin War.

== Filmography ==
=== Television ===
- Doctor John (SBS, 2019)
- Jang Yeong-sil (KBS1, 2016)
- The Jingbirok: A Memoir of Imjin War (KBS1, 2015)
- Dae Jo-yeong (KBS2, 2006)
- KBS HDTV Feature – "The Last Song!" (KBS1, 2006)
- Don't Worry (KBS2, 2005)
- 5th Republic (MBC, 2005)
- My Sweetheart My Darling (KBS1, 2005)
- Beijing My Love (KBS2, 2004)
- King's Woman (SBS, 2003)
- A Saint and a Witch (MBC, 2003)
- Saxophone (KBS2, 2002)
- Dae Bak Family (SBS, 2002)
- Love Rollercoaster (MBC, 2002)
- Drama City – "Golden Fish" (KBS, 2002)
- Piano (SBS, 2001)
- KBS HDTV Feature – "Stingray" (KBS, 2001)
- Promise (KBS1, 2000)
- The King and the Queen (KBS1, 1998)
- When Salmon Returns (SBS, 1996)
- KBS TV Novel – "White Dandelion" (KBS1, 1996)
- A Faraway Nation (KBS2, 1996)
- Ahn Joong-geun (안중근) (SBS, 1996)
- 4th Republic (MBC, 1995)
- Elegy (SBS, 1995)
- Kim Goo (KBS1, 1995)
- Age of Individuality (KBS2, 1995)
- Han Myung-hoe (KBS2, 1994)
- White Maze (KBS2, 1993)
- When I Miss You (KBS1, 1993)
- Wind in the Forest (KBS2, 1992)
- Kyoto 25th Hour (KBS2, 1991)
- Flowers That Never Wilt (KBS1, 1991)
- Mongshil (MBC, 1990)
- Daewongun (MBC, 1990)
- Freezing Point (KBS2, 1990)
- Half of a Failure (KBS2, 1989) ep 11
- The Forest Does Not Sleep (KBS2, 1989)
- Sunrise (KBS2, 1989)
- Winter Fog (MBC, 1989)
- Land (KBS1, 1987)
- KBS TV Novel – "Love" (KBS1, 1987)
- Silver Rapids (KBS2, 1985)
- Foundation of the Kingdom (KBS1, 1983)
- Three Sisters (KBS2, 1982)
- Who Are You (KBS2, 1982)
