= Mohe people =

Ancient ethnic group who lived in Northeast Asia

Chinese name
- Chinese: 靺鞨 or 靺羯
Transcriptions
Standard Mandarin
- Hanyu Pinyin: Mòhé Mòjié
- Wade–Giles: Mo-ho Mo-ja
Middle Chinese
- Middle Chinese: /muɑt̚ kɑt̚/

Korean name
- Hangul: 말갈
- Hanja: 靺鞨
Transcriptions
- Revised Romanization: Malgal
- McCune–Reischauer: Malgal

The Mohe, Malgal, Mogher, or Mojie, also known as the Wuji, Woju, or Mulgil were a Tungusic people who inhabited Northeast Asia between the 5th and 10th centuries AD. They lived a sedentary agrarian lifestyle in the region of the Amur, Songhua, and Ussuri rivers in modern day Northeast China and the Russian Far East. They first appeared in historical records during the 5th century AD as the Wuji confederation. The two most prominent Mohe groups were the Heishui Mohe located along the Amur River and the Sumo Mohe located along the Songhua River. They paid tribute to neighboring states such as Northern Wei and the Tang dynasty. Some Mohe tribes were at times in conflict with or subjects of Goguryeo.

Historical sources describe the Mohe people's involvement in the founding of Parhae (698–926) along with Goguryeo people, as well as making up a significant portion of the kingdom's population. However, there are multiple different interpretations of these sources and the role of the Mohe people in Parhae society due to a historiographical dispute involving China, Korea, Russia, and Japan. After Parhae was conquered by the Khitan-led Liao dynasty (916–1125), the Parhae people split into different groups, with a significant portion fleeing to Goryeo while others stayed behind in Liao territory.

The Mohe are commonly thought to be the progenitors of the Jurchen people who appeared in historical records during the 10th century. According to the ancestral traditions of 12th century Jurchens, they descended from the Heishui Mohe. Other Mohe elements such as the remaining Parhae population and the 10th century Mohe group known as the Wuguo "Five Nations" may have also contributed to their ethnogenesis. The Jurchen leader Aguda appealed to the Parhae people living in Liao territory by claiming a common descent for both the Jurchens and Parhae through the seven Wuji tribes. The later Manchu descendants of the Jurchen people who ruled the Qing dynasty (1636/1644–1912) also saw the Mohe and Parhae people as part of their ancestral background.

== Name ==
The Chinese exonym Mohe (靺鞨) is a graphic pejorative written with mo 靺 "socks; stockings" and he 鞨 "shoes". Mo (靺) (Middle Chinese: /muɑt̚/) is an adjective, a customary expression meaning "barbarian" or Xiongnu. Before the Five dynasties period, it was recorded as "靺羯", such as on the Honglujing Stele.

He 鞨 is gal (Middle Chinese gat or /ɦɑt̚/), meaning "stone" by Mohe/Malgal, Jie/Gal language. The Jie ruler Shi Le (石勒) takes the surname shi (石 "stone") from gal. According to the History of Jin (Jin Shi), Shi Tumen (石土門) is the prince of the Jurchen people, whose surname shi hints to a connection with the Mohe and Jie.

The ethnonym of the Mohe bears a notable resemblance to that of the later historically attested *Motgit in Middle Chinese (Chinese: 勿吉; pinyin: mò jí; Jyutping: mat6 gat1; Korean: 물길 [Mulgil]; Japanese: もつきつ [Motsukitsu]).

The name of the Mohe also appears as "Maka" in "Shin-Maka" (Japanese 新靺鞨, しんまか) or "New Mohe," which is the name of a dance and the musical piece that accompanies it; the dance and song were introduced to the Japanese court during the Nara period or around the beginning of the Heian period from the Parhae kingdom. In modern Japanese historical texts, the name of the Mohe is annotated with the "kana" reading Makkatsu (まっかつ), which is probably a transliteration based on the standard Sino-Japanese readings of the Chinese characters used to transcribe the ethnonym of the Mohe.

== History ==
=== Prehistoric ===
The Mohe people lived in what is now northeastern China during the Sui dynasty (581-618) and Tang dynasty (618-907) periods. Chinese records identified them with the Sushen and Yilou people who lived in that region during the Han dynasty (202 BC – 220 AD). The Sushen were described living in the Buxian Mountains during the times of the mythological emperors Yao and Shun. They are associated with archaeological findings dating to the 1st millennium BC attributed to the Xituanshan Culture, which had polished stone tools and pottery while bronze vessels were rare.

=== Wuji ===
During the 5th to 6th centuries, they were called Wuji or Woju, which are likely phonetic renderings of their name. In the Manchu language, the word weji (Wuji) means "forest". The Wuji were a confederation of numerous tribes, the most important of which were the Sumo, Boduo, Anchegu (Anjugu), Funie, Haoshi, Heishui, and Baishan. The southernmost tribe was the Sumo (named after the Songhua River) while the northernmost tribe was the "Black Water" Heishui (named after the Amur River). They were considered the two most powerful tribes. Their chieftains were called da mofumanduo. They lived in the region of the Amur, Songhua, and Ussuri rivers. They sent tribute to the Northern Wei dynasty (386-534).

The Wuji were considered tough fighters. In 478, the Wuji envoy Yilizhi arrived at the Northern Wei court claiming that his people had seized ten Goguryeo villages and were making plans with Paekche to attack Goguryeo together by river. Emperor Xiaowen of Northern Wei declined to support the Wuji and warned Yilizhi not to proceed with their plans. According to the Book of Sui, the Sumo Mohe were situated right next to Goguryeo, which they often raided, and the Baishan Mohe were located to their southeast. The New Book of Tang states that the Mazi (Yalu River) originates in the territory of the Baishan Mohe.

In 493, they attacked and defeated Buyeo. According to the Samguk sagi, in 494, the king of Buyeo and his family fled to Goguryeo. The Book of Wei states that in 504, the king of Goguryeo told the Wei emperor that he could no longer send tributes of gold because that gold had come from Buyeo, and the Buyeo had been expelled by the Wuji. Archeological evidence in the area formerly occupied by Buyeo in modern Jilin confirms that a cultural layer associated with the Mohe people overlays the Buyeo layer and a third Bronze Age layer. According to Mark E. Byington, the Mohe who settled in Buyeo territory came to be known as the Sumo, and are to some degree the cultural composite of the Mohe and Buyeo survivors.

=== Mohe ===
In the late 6th century, Chinese sources started calling them Mohe. They were described as sedentary agriculturists known for their pig breeding who occasionally engaged in hunting activity. They grew crops such as soybean, wheat, millet, and rice. They lived in earth huts, their women wore skirts, and their men had clothes made of pig or dog skin. They traded in reindeer products and may have ridden them as well. Horses were rare in Mohe society until the Tang period (618–907) and pastoralism was not widespread until the 10th century under Khitan domination. Mass slavery was part of Mohe culture and slaves were used for both agricultural work and hunting. In temperament they were fierce and uncultured. They used poisoned arrows. The southernmost Mohe tribe was the Sumo and they often came into conflict with their neighbors such as Goguryeo.

Records during the Sui dynasty (581–618) indicate that only the Sumo and Baishan were in direct contact with the Sui court. The Baishan were subjects of Goguryeo and could field 3,000 elite troops. The Sumo had several thousand elite troops. When the Sumo attempted to establish diplomatic relations with the Sui, Goguryeo attacked them and obstructed their missions from 584 to 590. Military conflict ceased for a brief period after the Sui emperor warned Goguryeo in 590, but from 593 to 598, Goguryeo attacked the Sumo and pushed them out of the former territory of Buyeo. Goguryeo established direct control over the region by building the fortress of Buyeoseong (in modern Jilin City). The Sumo leader Tudiji fled to the Sui.

Previously, during the Kaihuang reign [581–600] the Sumo Mohe engaged Koguryŏ unsuccessfully in battle. The chieftain of the Tuji community, Tudiji 突地稽, led several thousand excellent troops of eight communities, including the Hushilai, Kutushi, Yuejimeng, Yueyu, Buhulai, Poxi, and Bubuguali communities, and led forth the villages from the northwest of Puyŏ Fortress 扶餘城, headed to the pass and put in with [Sui]. They were settled at Liucheng 柳城 [modern Chaoyang] and to the north of Yanjun 燕郡 [modern Yixian].

— Taiping huanyu ji

Emperor Yang of Sui (r. 604-617) ordered the Sumo chieftain Tudiji to settle his people in Yingzhou (modern Chaoyang, Liaoning). In 598, Goguryeo sent a large cavalry force, said to be 10,000 strong and composed of mostly Mohe troops, to attack Tudiji. The attack was repelled by the governor of Yingzhou. The Sui responded with their first major campaign against Goguryeo later that year. In 612, Tudiji was appointed governor of Liaoxi Commandery and given the title of Marquis of Puyŏ. He participated in the Goguryeo-Sui War in 613 and 614. Tudiji submitted to the Tang dynasty (618–907) and kept Liaoxi Commandery under its new name Yanzhou. In 623, Tudiji and his followers moved to Youzhou where he assisted the Tang in putting down various rebellions. They settled in the city of Changping to the northwest of modern Beijing. He died in 627 after having received the imperial surname Li from the Tang court. His son, Li Jinhang, moved back to Yingzhou and participated as a commander in the Goguryeo–Tang War.

Ashina Xichun (r. 619-620) of the Eastern Turkic Khaganate planned to attack the Tang dynasty with the aid of several other groups including the Mohe but he died of rheumatism in late 620.

In 622, the Heishui chieftain Agulang visited the Tang capital and in 628, Heishui territory was nominally incorporated into the Tang under the name of Yanzhou. In late 629, a Mohe chieftain sent tribute to the Tang.

In 636, Shenzhou was established to support displaced Sumo villages aas well as the Shiwei tribe of Wusugu.

In 645, the Mohe sided with Goguryeo at the battles of Jupil and Ansi, which contributed to the Tang defeat. The Mohe also sided with Goguryeo against the Tang and Silla in other instances prior to Goguryeo's collapse in 668. In 655, a Silla envoy to the Tang said that a combined force of Goguryeo, Paekche, and Mohe were harassing their northern border. After the destruction of Goguryeo, the Tang put Bojang of Goguryeo in charge of Liaodong, but he sought to revive Goguryeo with the help of the Mohe and was banished to southwestern China.

In 690, part of Shenzhou became Lizhou, which was established for displaced Fuyu (Buyeo) Mohe and the Wusugu. Fuyu Mohe was another name for Sumo Mohe. According to Byington, this suggests that the Sumo Mohe associated themselves with Buyeo, although it is uncertain what this indicates, whether it was perceived genealogical or political descent, a claim to legitimacy, or simple geographical association. Byington considers geographical association to be the more likely choice.

In 722, the chieftain Nishuliji visited the Tang court and was appointed regional inspector (cishi) of Boli. Later on, the chieftain of the Heishui Mohe was appointed commander-in-chief (dudu). A commissioner was dispatched by the Tang court to supervise the appointment of subordinate chiefs (zhou cishi). In 728, the dudu of Heishui was bestowed the imperial surname Li and made a regulatory commissioner (jinglüeshi) as well as dudu of Youzhou (modern Beijing).

=== Parhae ===
The Mohe people made up part of the population of the Northeast Asian state of Parhae (698–926), also rendered as Bohai. The exact significance and role of the Mohe people in Parhae society is controversial due to being part of a historiographical dispute between China, Korea, Russia, and Japan. There are a number of historical sources that describe the relationship between the founder of Parhae, Tae Choyŏng (Da Zuorong), and the Mohe and Goguryeo people in different ways. The Old Book of Tang states that Tae Choyŏng was a Mohe person but links him to Goguryeo by the term biezhong (gaoli biezhong; 高麗別種). Literally speaking, biezhong means "separate kind." Due to the ambiguity of the wording, the term has been interpreted as meaning "a branch of the Goguryeo people" by South and North Korean historians, but as "distinct from Goguryeo" by Chinese and Japanese researchers. The New Book of Tang refers to Tae Choyŏng and his state as Sumo Mohe affiliated with Goguryeo before it received investiture from China and assumed the name "Bohai".

According to Ch'oe Ch'iwŏn (b. 857), a scholar from the Korean kingdom of Silla, the people of Parhae were Mohe. Sillan aristocracy tended to view the Parhae population as consisting of solely Mohe people, but this could be due to the antagonistic relations between the two states causing the Sillan nobility to ignore Goguryeo elements of Parhae's ethnic composition. The Samguk sagi, written in the 12th century by Kim Pusik, did not consider Parhae a Korean state. The Samguk yusa, a 13th-century collection of Korean history and legends, describes Tae as a Sumo Mohe leader. However, it gives another account of Tae being a former Goguryeo general, citing a now-lost Sillan record. While diplomatic communications between Parhae and Japan recognized it as a successor state of Goguryeo and Buyeo, a 9th-century Japanese text also states that all of Parhae's villages were Mohe tribes.

Different interpretations of the historical sources include: the ruling class of Parhae were Goguryeo people while the people they ruled over were the Mohe, the ruling class of Parhae and its primary ethnicity were Mohe, the Mohe were a Tungusic people who had assimilated into Goguryeo and Parhae, there was no difference between the Goguryeo and Mohe population and they were ethnically the same, the Mohe were a part of Goguryeo's provincial population and Mohe was a pejorative term for the lower class.

=== Transition to Jurchens ===
By the time Parhae was conquered by the Khitan-led Liao dynasty in 926, its people's way of living had come to resemble that of the northern Chinese. The Liao dynasty classified the Parhae population as Han in legal and taxation contexts, the same as those whose ancestry was traced to the Tang empire. Some Mohe groups did not adopt this manner of life and were excluded from the Liao's designation of Parhae. Instead, they remained as Mohe, and possibly became one of the groups that eventually coalesced into the Jurchen people. The Mohe people are the most commonly cited progenitors of the Jin dynasty (1115–1234) and its ruling Jurchen ethnic group.

According to the ancestral traditions of early 12th century Jurchens, their people emerged from the Heishui Mohe in the forested mountain areas of eastern Manchuria and Russia's Primorsky Krai. Byington states that the name "Jurchen" first appeared following the collapse of Parhae and refers to the people who formerly lived under Parhae jurisdiction, including people under Parhae's influence in the north such as the Heishui Mohe. The Heishui Mohe moved into the ruins of Parhae after 928. In the 10th century, the Mohe formed a group known as the Wuguo ("Five Nations") federation to the northeast of modern Jilin that is also considered to have contributed to rise of the Jurchens.

The Jurchens may have been mentioned as the Little Ruzhe people who presented silver and gold to the Tang court in 748, otherwise the Jurchens do not appear in historical records until the 10th century as tribute bearers to the Liao, Later Tang, and Song courts. A Jurchen embassy to Later Tang is recorded in 925 and an embassy to the Song in 961 that arrived by sea via the Liaodong peninsula. They practiced hunting, fishing, and kept domestic oxen while their primary export was horses. They had no script, calendar, or offices during the mid-11th century. The Jurchens were minor political actors in the international system at the time. By the 10th century, the Jurchens had become vassals of the Liao dynasty, but they also sent a number of tributary and trade missions to the Song capital of Kaifeng, which the Liao tried unsuccessfully to prevent. Some Jurchens paid tribute to Goryeo and sided with them during the Goryeo–Khitan War. They offered tribute to both courts out of political necessity and for material benefits.

In the early 12th century, the Jurchen leader Aguda sent ambassadors to the Liao dynasty to call on the Parhae people there to rebel against the Liao by appealing to a common origin between the Jurchens and Parhae. Aguda claimed that "the Jurchens and Bohai were originally of the same family" (女直渤海本同一家) and that they were "actually one family, because in origin they were consisted of seven Wuji tribes." While the appeal states that both the Jurchens and Parhae people descended from the seven Wuji tribes, according to Alexander Kim, this only applied to the Mohe portion of Parhae's population and not the Goguryeo people who were not included in the seven Wuji tribes. The call for Parhae cooperation against the Liao Khitans was a success. A Song observer notes that due to discrimination in the Liao government against Parhae people, they were the first to defect to the Jin. Many Parhae people who were deeply integrated into the Jin state eventually rejected their Parhae identity and chose to identify as Chinese.

The later Qing dynasty, ruled by Manchu descendants of the Jurchens, made efforts to solidify Parhae as part of their ancestral background. In 1778, the Qianlong Emperor commissioned a new comprehensive history of the Manchus, the Researches on Manchu Origins. Part of this endeavor was to create a new imperial history of Manchus that placed their Jin ancestors, the Jin imperial clan, among the population of the Mohe who lived in the Changbai Mountains and along the Amur. Qianlong repeatedly made references to the Parhae as the origin of various organizational features such as the use of "the five-capitals, a writing system, and a leadership hierarchy that he believed was evident in early Qing history and still in use among Northeastern peoples."

Archaeological materials from the Anan'evskoe site also support the existence of ancestral relations between the Jurchens and Parhae people. Several South Korean scholars suggest that after Parhae's destruction in 926, its population was divided into two groups. Influential Parhae families were sent to the inner part of the Liao dynasty and were referred to as Parhae people while those who remained under indirect management were called Jurchen. Soviet and Russian scholars agree that there were hereditary relationships between the Mohe and Jurchen people and that the Parhae population certainly contributed culturally to the ethnogenesis of the Jurchen. However, some differences remain between the two populations. The Parhae refugee population was received well in the Korean kingdom of Goryeo while they had a combative relationship with the Jurchens. In diplomatic communications with the Song dynasty, Goryeo referred to the Jurchens as greedy liars and other insulting names. The Jurchens likewise described Goryeo people as enemies and often came into military conflict with them. The Jurchen and Parhae people also differed in their level of technological and societal sophistication. Chinese sources describe the Jurchens as lacking law, governors, kings, or dignitaries. Prior to the reign of Wanyan Wugunai (1021–1074) in the early 11th century, the Jurchens could not produce iron armor and had to trade for it from other tribes. Pei Huang claims that the Heishui Mohe were relatively backward and benefited from the fertile land and high technology left by Parhae.

== Tribes ==
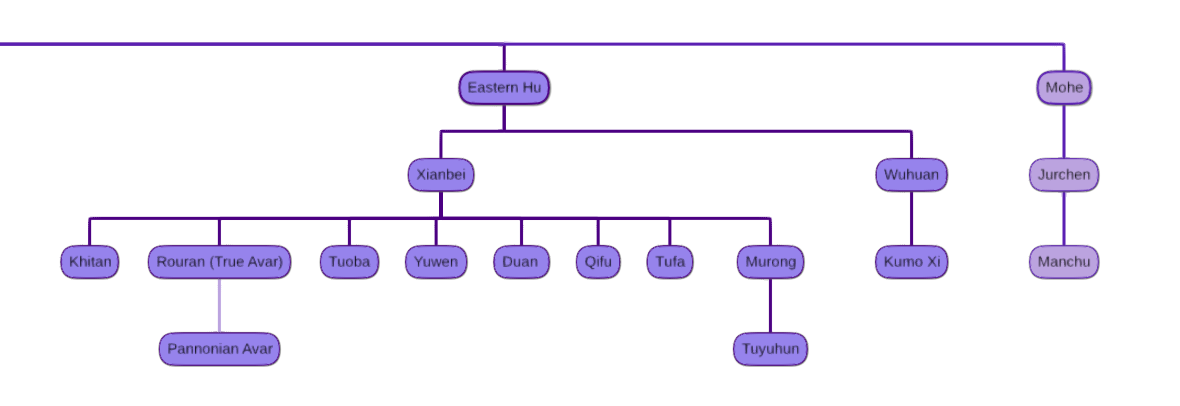
Lineage of the Mohe people

According to some records, there were seven or maybe eight Mohe tribes :

Moji/Merjie/Wuji/Matgat (勿吉)	Mohe/Mogher/Malgal/Muthot (靺鞨)	Modern location	Settlements
Sumo tribe 粟末部 (Sùmò Bù) 속말부 (Sogmalbu)	Sumo tribe 粟末部 (Sùmò Bù) 속말부 (Sogmalbu)	near Songhua River	
Baishan tribe 白山部 (Báishān Bù) 백산부 (Baeksanbu)	Baishan tribe 白山部 (Báishān Bù) 백산부 (Baeksanbu)	near Paektu Mountain	
Yulou tribe 虞婁 (Yúlóu) 우루 (Uru)	Yulou tribe 虞婁 (Yúlóu) 우루 (Uru)	on the Suifun River Basin	
Boduo tribe 伯咄部 (Bóduō Bù) 백돌부 (Baekdolbu)	Boduo tribe 伯咄部 (Bóduō Bù) 백돌부 (Baekdolbu)	near the Lalin River	
Funie tribe 拂涅部 (Fúniè Bù) 불열 (Buryeol)	Funie tribe 拂涅部 (Fúniè Bù) 불열 (Buryeol)	near the Mudan River on the Khanka Basin	dwelled in Jixi and Mudanjiang
Anchegu tribe 安車骨部/安车骨部 (Ānchēgǔ Bù) 안차골부 (Anchagolbu)	Tieli tribe 鐵利 (Tiělì) 철리 (Cheolli)	near the Songhwa River	dwelled in Harbin
Haoshi tribe 號室部/号室部 (Hàoshì Bù) 호실부 (Hosilbu)	Yuexi tribe 越喜 (Yuèxǐ) 월희 (Wolhui)		dwelled in Dalnerechensk
Heishui tribe 黑水部 (Hēishuǐ Bù) 흑수부 (Heuksubu)	Heishui tribe 黑水部 (Hēishuǐ Bù) 흑수부 (Heuksubu)	low banks of Amur River	dwelled in Hegang, Jiamusi, Shuangyashan, Khabarovsk, Birobidzhan, Yichun

== Notable personalities ==
=== Prefecture Mohe chieftains ===
- Sumo Mohe
  - Tudiji (突地稽 pinyin: Tūdìjī, Manchu: Tulergi (alien people), Hangul: 돌지계), ca. 580-620
  - Li Jinhang (李謹行 pinyin: Lǐ Jǐnháng, Hangul: 이근행), 619-683, Tudiji's son
  - Dae Joyeong (大祚榮 pinyin: Dá Zuòróng, Hangul: 대조영), ?-719
- Baishan Mohe
  - Geolsa Biu (乞四比羽 pinyin: Qǐsì Bǐyǔ, Hangul: 걸사비우)
- Heisui Mohe
  - A Tou (阿頭 pinyin: Ā Tóu, Manchu: Uju (head, chief), Hangul:아두)
  - Tou Fu (陁弗 pinyin: Toú fú, Hangul: 타불)
  - Su Wugai (蘇勿蓋 pinyin: Sū Wùgài, Manchu: Sotki (crusian), Hangul: 소홀개)
  - Gao Zhimen (高之門 pinyin: Gāo Zīemén, Manchu: Hocihon mangga (handsome and strong), Hangul: 고지문)
  - Wusukemeng (烏素可蒙 pinyin: Wū sù kě méng, Manchu: Osohon mangga (small but strong), Hangul: 오소고몽)
  - Nishuliji (倪屬利稽 pinyin: Ní shǔ lì jī, Manchu: Nisurigi (finger ring for archery), Hangul: 아속리계)
- Funie Mohe
  - Shiyimeng (失異夢 pinyin: Shī yì mèng, Manchu: Silin mangga (elite and strong), Hangul: 실이몽)
  - Li Duozuo (李多祚 pinyin: Lǐ Duōzuò, Hangul: 이다조)
- Yuexi Mohe
  - Wushikemeng (烏施可蒙 pinyin: Wū shī kě méng, Manchu: Osohon mangga (small but strong), Hangul: 오시가몽)

== See also ==
- Balhae
- Jie people (Gal people)
- Shi Le
- Guanqiu Jian
