= Honglujing Stele =

Tang dynasty tablet

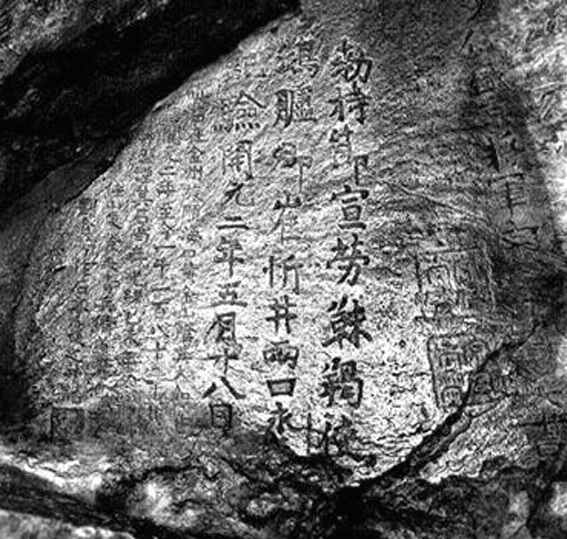
The Honglujing carving in 1895, before it was moved to Japan as a stele.

The Honglujing Stele (simplified Chinese: 鸿胪井; traditional Chinese: 鴻臚井; pinyin: Hónglújǐng) is a tablet 3 meters wide, 1.8 meters tall, & 2 meters thick. It has 29 Chinese characters written on it.

It is the only Tang dynasty stele found in Manchuria. It mentions the founding king of Balhae, King Go.

The stele is currently located in the Tokyo Imperial Palace. It was looted by the Japanese from the Chinese city of Lüshun in circa 1907 after the Russo-Japanese War. Chinese researchers are now studying it for the first time.
