= Liuding Mountain =

Mountain in Jilin province, China

Coordinates: 43°18′59″N 128°14′37″E

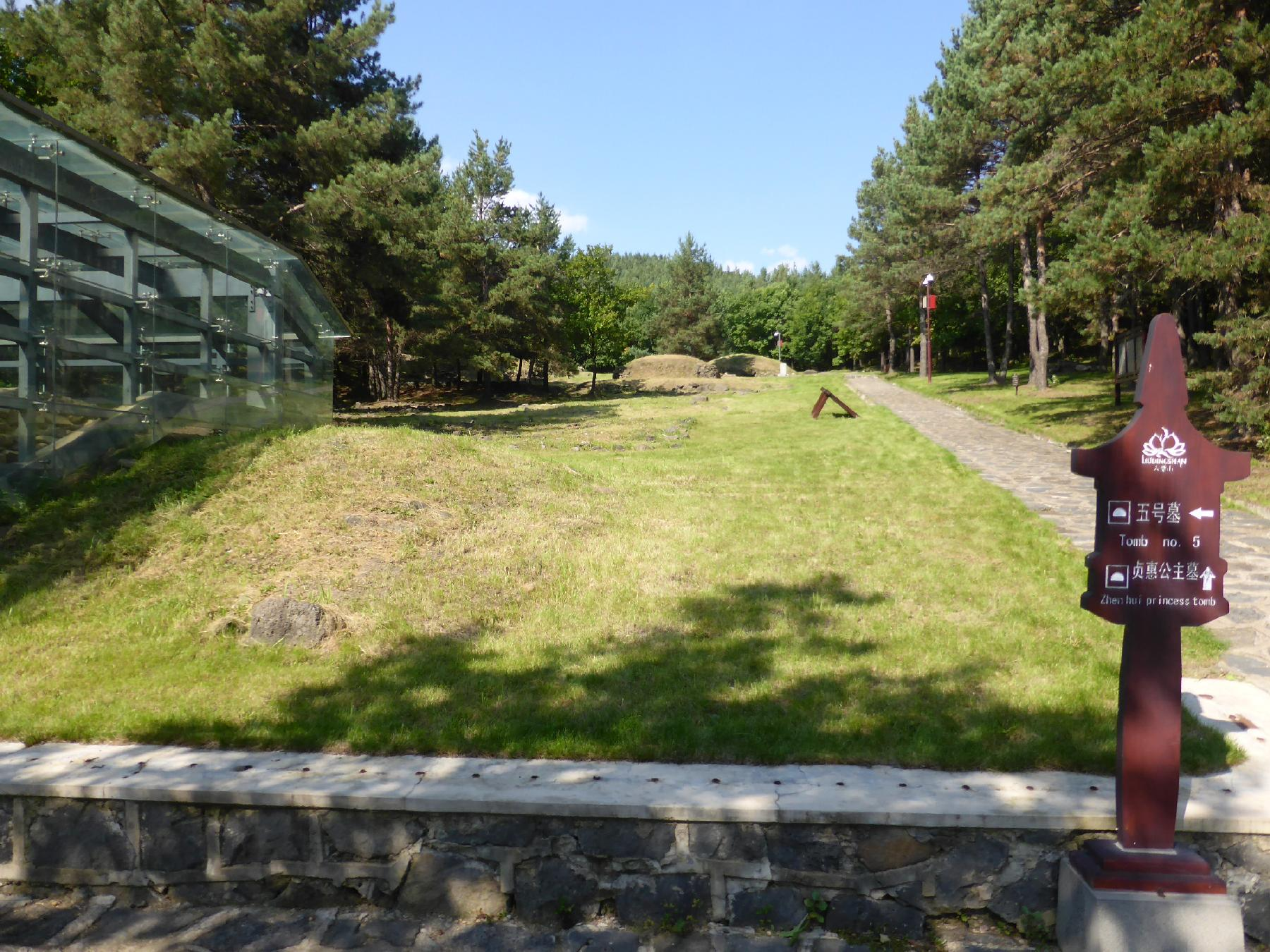
Tombs on Liuding Mountain

Liuding Mountain, also called Liudingshan or Mount Liuding is a historical site and tourist attraction in Dunhua, Yanbian, Jilin. It is one of the AAAAA Tourist Attractions of China.

The site is located 5 km to the south of Dunhua and on the right bank of the Mudan River. The mountain consists of six separate hilltops arrayed from East to West, the highest of which is 603 meters above sea level.

A 48-meter statue of the Buddha is located on one of the peaks, facing south. There is also a large monastery.

== Balhae Royal Tombs ==
There are ancient tombs on the mountain, which was the graveyard of the royal family of the Balhae kingdom. The tombs were excavated by Yanbian University, Jilin Provincial Museum, and the Archaeology Research Institute of the Chinese Academy of Sciences in 1949, 1959 and 1964. There are more than 90 different tombs, including the tomb of Princess Zhenhui, one of the children of Mun of Balhae. The tomb was built of basalt and fulgurite. Many objects were found: pottery, gold-plated copper jewellery and jade. Her tombstone (90 x 49 x 29 cm) bears an epigraph of more than 700 characters written in Chinese, which is an indication that the Balhae kingdom used Chinese characters, making the stone historically significant.

Some people claim that Liudingshan is the true location of Dongmu Mountain, the first capital city of the Balhae kingdom.
