= Li Jinzhong =

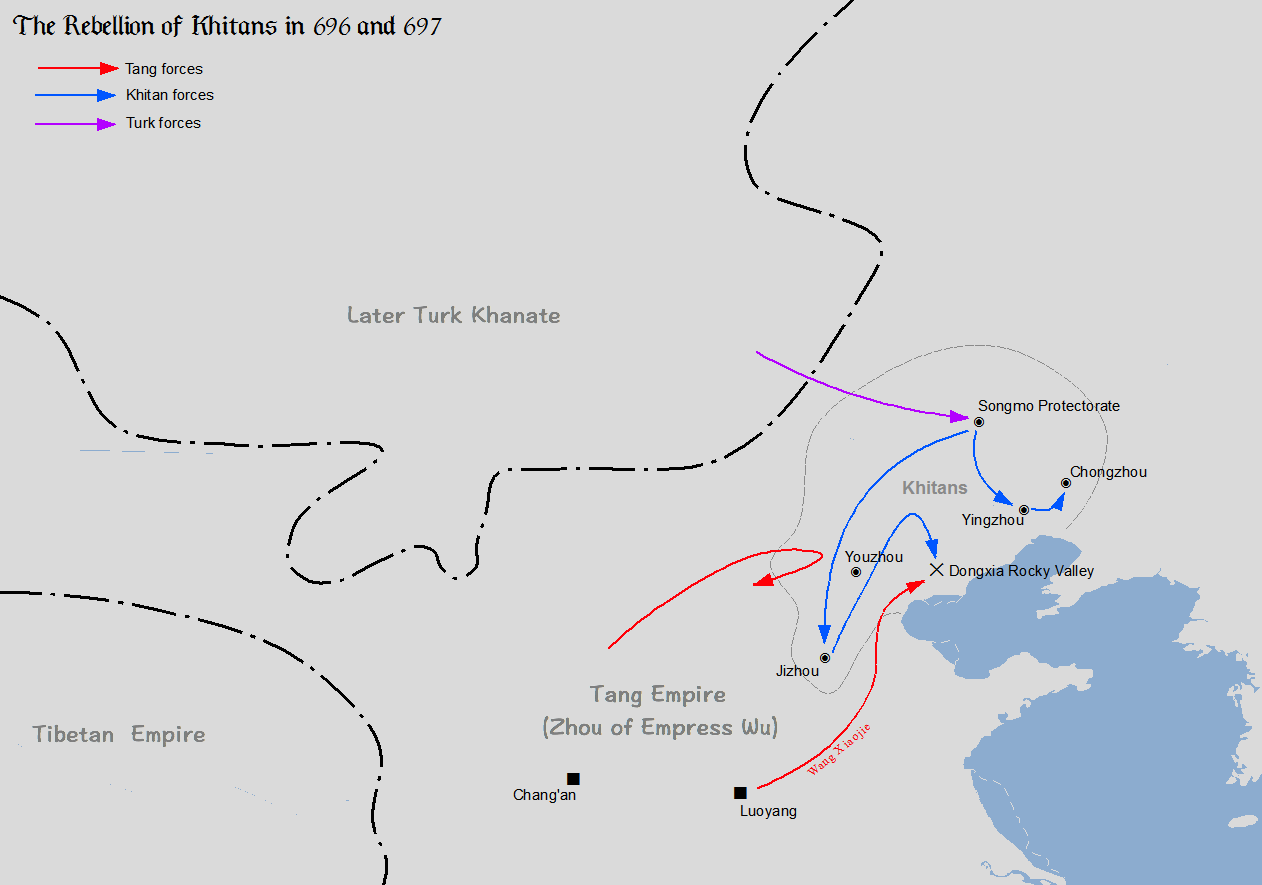
The Khitan rebellion led by Li Jinzhong

Li Jinzhong (Chinese: 李盡忠) (died September 23, 696), titled Wushang Khan (無上可汗, literally "the khan that had no superior"), was a khan of the Khitans who, along with his brother-in-law Sun Wanrong, rose against the Wu Zhou dynasty in 696 and further invaded Wu Zhou territories. He died late in 696 and was succeeded by Sun.

He was the grandson of Li Kuge.

== In popular culture ==
- Portrayed by Kim Dong-hyeon in the 2006-2007 KBS TV series Dae Jo-yeong.
