= Sun Wanrong =

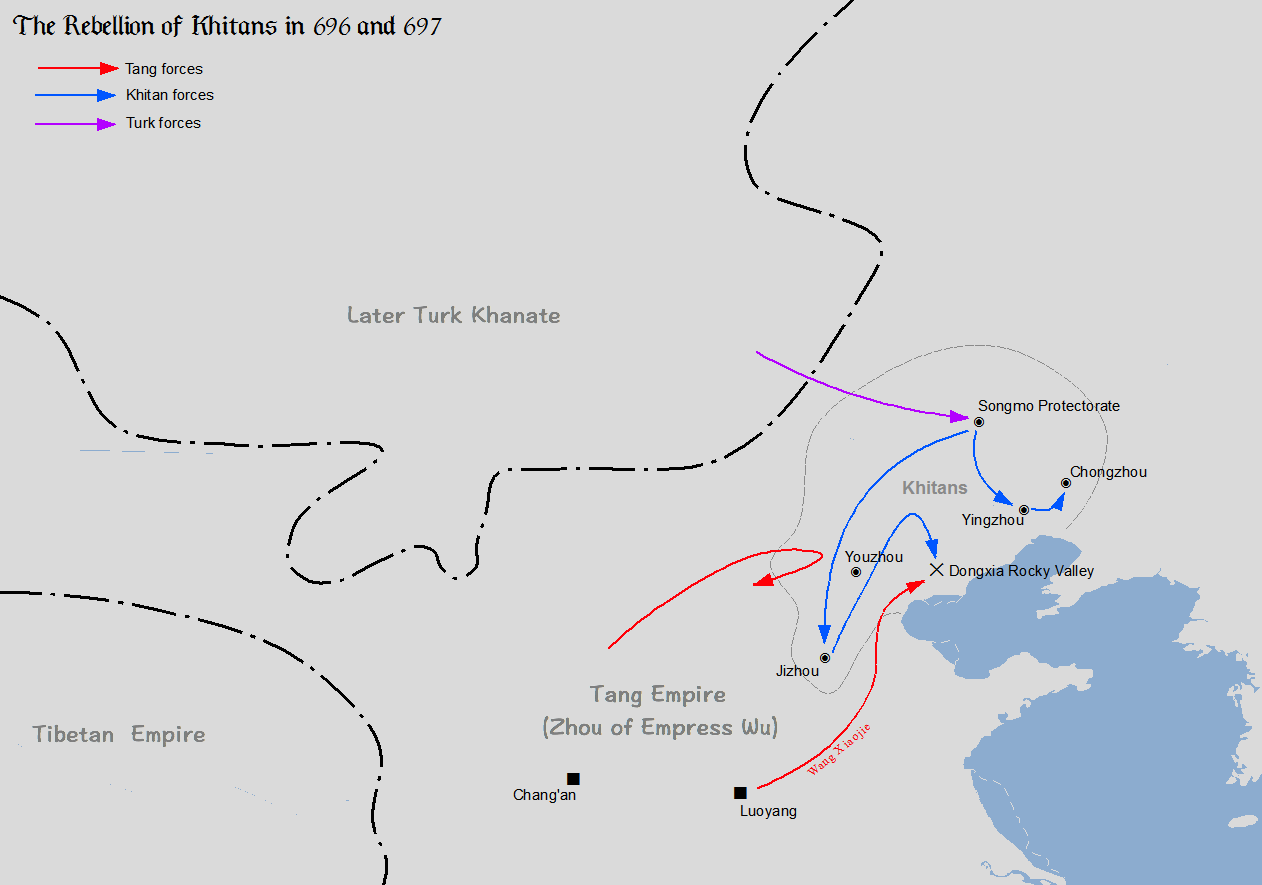
Map showing the Khitan rebellion led by Li Jinzhong and Sun Wanrong

Sun Wanrong (Chinese: 孫萬榮) (died 697) was a khan of the Khitans. Along with his brother-in-law Li Jinzhong, he rose against Wu Zhou hegemony in 696, and, with Li Jinzhong as khan, they further invaded Wu Zhou territory. After Li Jinzhong's death later in 696, Sun succeeded him and continued to be successful against the forces sent against him by the Zhou empress Wu Zetian, but in 697, after the Tujue khan Ashina Mochuo successfully launched a surprise attack against Sun's headquarters, Sun's forces collapsed, and he was killed, ending the Khitan rebellion.

== In popular culture ==
- Portrayed by Cho In-pyo in the 2006-2007 KBS TV series Dae Jo-yeong.
