= Startling by Each Step =

Startling by Each Step (simplified Chinese: 步步惊心; traditional Chinese: 步步驚心) may refer to:

- Startling by Each Step (novel), Tong Hua's novel
- Startling by Each Step (TV series), Chinese television series

== See also ==
- Moon Lovers: Scarlet Heart Ryeo (달의 연인 – 보보경심 려; Hanja: 달의 戀人 – 步步驚心 麗), South Korean television series
