= List of Scarlet Heart episodes =

Scarlet Heart, also known as Bubu Jingxin, is a Chinese television series based on the novel of the same Chinese title by Tong Hua. Filming for the series started on 6 December 2010 in Shanghai and ended on 22 March 2011. It first aired in China on the Hunan Broadcasting System (HBS) on 10 September 2011. The following is a list of episodes.

== Episodes ==
No.	Title	Original release date
1	"Episode One"	October 1, 2011
Zhang Xiao is a typical modern day 9-to-5 white-collar worker struggling day to day to advance her career. Her dreams of the future mirrored those of any modern day city worker - a home, travel and love. One day, Zhang Xiao's life changes dramatically when she is involved in a car accident and her soul is transported into the past. She wakes to finds herself in the imperial residence of the eighth prince, Yinsi, during the reign of Kangxi Emperor of the Qing Dynasty. She is tended by maidservants who refer to her as Second Miss Ma'ertai Ruoxi, 16-year-old daughter of a Manchu aristocrat and younger sister of the eighth prince's concubine Ma'ertai Roulan, and tell her that she is recuperating from a fall.
2	"Episode Two"	September 10, 2011
The fourth prince, Yinzhen, brings some medicine for Ruoxi and asks her to cherish her life. Having recovered, Ruoxi volunteers to read letters to her elder sister but is ridiculed for not knowing many of the words, as she is unfamiliar with traditional text having only learnt the simplified form. Determined not to seem illiterate, she begins to study but is persuaded by the tenth prince, Yin'e, to go horse riding. Being unable to ride, Ruoxi fears that she would be revealed as an impostor but she is fortunate that Yinsi has selected the best horse for her. Despite knowing his future ends in tragedy, Ruoxi nonetheless begins to develop feelings for him. On Yin'e's birthday, Yinsi selects Roulan to manage the celebrations. He feels that, as Ruolan is held in low regard by the court and even the servants have scant respect for her, this is an opportunity for her to show her culinary skills. Before the celebrations, Ruoxi and Gororo Mingyu, younger sister of Yinsi's wife Gororo Minghui's, argue over a rabbit that Ruoxi had captured but had been stolen by Mingyu. Ruoxi uses Yin'e's hound to get revenge on Mingyu but inadvertently injures the prince in their resulting fight. Yin'e's birthday celebrations are a success and Ruolan is soundly praised by all the attendees except Minghui. Watching the princes enjoying the festivities, Ruoxi's spirits are dampened by the knowledge of the terrible fate that awaits them.
3	"Episode Three"	September 11, 2011
The princes gather for drinks in one of the great halls. Having drunk too much, Yin'e rushes out to be sick but is seen by Ruoxi who, to his delight, has arrived bearing a birthday gift, a thousand personally folded paper cranes and also sings 'Happy Birthday to You' for him. Unknown to the both of them, Mingyu also appears and after some heated words with Ruoxi, the two girls start fighting eventually falling into a pond. Fortunately, Yinxiang and Yinti, respectively the thirteenth and the fourteenth princes, arrive to help them from the pond. Ruoxi scolds Mingyu again, leaving her in tears. Her biting words and her furious demeanor earn her the nickname of "Defiant Thirteenth Sister". Ruolan is angered by Ruoxi's behavior and refuses to speak to her for several days. The Mid-Autumn Festival arrives and Ruoxi is summoned before the emperor. Ruolan trains Ruoxi in court etiquette to avoid humiliating herself before the imperial court. During the festival, the Kangxi Emperor arranges a marriage between Yin'e and Mingyu, crushing the former's hopes of taking Ruoxi as his wife but he is unable to defy his father's command. Seeing that even the princes have no control over their own fates, Ruoxi becomes afraid of the imperial court for the first time. Upon returning to the imperial residence, she dashes from the carriage causing others to mistake her fear for sadness at the Yin'e's betrothal.
4	"Episode Four"	September 11, 2011
Since the Mid-Autumn Festival and the announcement of Yin'e's engagement, Ruoxi has been moody. The inability to control one's destiny drove her to melancholy. Yin'e becomes depressed and spends much of his time drinking. Yinti believes that only Ruoxi can break him from this depression. Ruoxi meets Yin'e for the last time and lets him know of her feelings for him. Winter arrives and Ruoxi revels in the crystalline weather, frolicking in the snow when Yinsi joins her. In a moment of awkwardness, she nearly falls but Yinsi catches her hand to steady her, but does not let go. His behavior confuses Ruoxi and she feels a sense of guilt towards her sister. Yin'e's wedding day arrives and both Ruoxi and Ruolan attend, but Ruoxi is taken aside by Yinxiang. In their sadness, the two of them drink to drown their sorrows. After a time, they share their sorrows and it is an unburdened, though drunken, Ruoxi when she returns to her estate. The princes intend to hold a horse race and Ruoxi asks her sister to attend, but Ruolan mysteriously refuses. Ruoxi investigates and coincidentally hears about a general, which deepens her curiosity.
5	"Episode Five"	September 12, 2011
Yinxiang and Yinti discuss the concept of "equality and freedom", which Yinxiang heard from Ruoxi when she spoke of "the thoughts of modern people". Everyone considers her thoughts as being heretical to the way of life they know. During the horse race, Mingyu performs spectacularly impressing the audience. In a moment of pique, Mingyu angers Ruoxi into mounting up, but to her chagrin Ruolan requests that she be permitted to perform and impresses everyone with her grace. Yinsi later goes to Ruolan, hoping to help her forget her pain so that, as a married couple, they can start anew but is coldly rejected by Ruolan. Ruoxi and Yinxiang discuss their lack of etiquette on Yin'e's wedding night but discover that it is all a misunderstanding. Yinxiang was not unhappy because of his feelings for Mingyu but on that night but because his mother was giving birth and Ruoxi was not unhappy because of Yin'e. With their misunderstandings cleared, Yinxiang takes Ruoxi to the home of his best friend, Luwu, and the three talks and enjoy each other's company late into the night. When Rouxi returns to her estate, she realizes that it is very late and goes to Ruolan to apologize but happens upon her sister gazing longingly at a portrait. Bit by bit, Ruolan tells of what happened years ago. Yinsi had always loved Ruolan but when they were wed he discovered that her heart belonged to another, her childhood friend from the steppes, Qingshan. In a bid to ensure she marries Yinsi, Ruolan's father sends Qingshan to war where he dies in battle. Ruolan, unable to forgive Yinsi, spends her days with a small Buddha. To help Yinsi see Ruolan as she was in the past, Ruoxi gives a jade bracelet to her sister but Ruolan mistaken believes that the gift is from Yinxiang. In time, the period for selecting attendants arrives and the princes are concerned for Ruoxi. Yinsi suddenly announces that he chooses to spend the night with Ruolan, dismaying Minghui. Unused to the all night custom, Ruoxi has trouble staying awake, but while in a doze she hears Ruoxi and Yinsi discussing her and Yinxiang. As Ruoxi and Yinxiang are quite close, they decide to arrange for her to serve him.
6	"Episode Six"	September 12, 2011
The end of the year arrives and Ruoxi attends The Lantern Festival with Qiaohui. At the festival, they meet Yinxiang who is with Luwu and the four of them go to enjoy some food and drink where they meet Yinti and the other princes. Seeing Ruoxi with Luwu, Yinti feels that Ruoxi is lowering her status and quickly takes her to Yinsi. Yinsi tells her of Ruolan's past, which leaves confused Ruoxi wondering whether he has feelings for her or takes her for her sister's replacement. Thanks to the efforts of the princes, Ruoxi has not yet been selected as an attendant. Several of the concubines state their desire to have Ruoxi serve them but the empress, not wanting to offend anyone, sends her to be a tea serving girl to the emperor himself. As a rookie, she is cautious but with her modern era smarts she gradually gains the confidence of the emperor and soon appointed as the lead tea server. During discussions concerning an issue with the heir, the emperor commands that the younger princes speak. The simple-minded Yin'e puts forth his opinion, but inadvertently disrespects Yinzhen. To help him save face, Ruoxi spills tea on him stopping him from speaking further. This is witnessed by the senior eunuch Li Dequan who warns her not to involve herself in such matters. Yinti, however, thinks she has designs on Yinzhen and warns her not to betray Yinsi. Ruoxi later coincidentally meets Yinzhen who tells her that in the future she is welcome to come to him if she ever has any problems.
7	"Episode Seven"	September 13, 2011
The storm over the impeachment of the heir eventually passes and so to gain favor with the emperor, the princes suggest that they accompany the emperor on a trip out of the palace. The emperor commands the Yinsi to remain behind to administer to the affairs of state. In fact, it is a ploy by the heir to reduce the power of Yinsi's faction and to make the prince a scapegoat in the event of anything going awry while the emperor is away. The infighting amongst the brothers becomes increasingly apparent. Yinzhen brings Ruoxi along for the trip with the emperor, suggesting that she bring some more tea and be careful. As he has to remain behind to administer to the affairs of state, Yinsi forlornly bids Ruoxi farewell. Yinsi finds out that it was Minghui's interference that caused Ruoxi to be unable to serve any of the concubines. As a result, he ignores Minghui who begs his forgiveness and promises never to do anything to displease him again. Meanwhile, Ruoxi, as part of her tea serving duties, delivers tea to the emperor and the princes in individually selected cups bringing praise from all. Ruoxi then requests that the emperor permit her to learn horse riding, which he happily permits. Yinxiang meets Mongolian Princess Minmin at the goat roping arena and become friends, but neither knows of the others' birthright. However, that night the emperor orders that a party be held and while performing, Minmin sees Yinxiang, who had introduced himself as "Little Star" at the arena. To her surprise, he speaks to her in Mongolian and an attraction begins to grow between them. Ruoxi convinces Yinxiang to teach her horse riding and the two agree to meet that night. Yinsi had arranged for a full set of riding attire to be delivered to Ruoxi and so wearing the prince's gift, Ruoxi waits on the steppe for Yinxiang, but in a twist, it is Yinzhen who appears to teach her and the ensuing lesson leaves Ruoxi completely exhausted.
8	"Episode Eight"	September 13, 2011
Ruoxi is angered that Yinxiang failed to attend the horse-riding lesson as promised. He had promised to go but had been intercepted on the way by Minmin to go sheep herding. Yinzhen, on his own initiative, took his place as Ruoxi's riding tutor. On seeing him, she tries to leave but is caught by the prince who passionately kisses her. That night, she goes to find Yinxiang to get an explanation as to why was not there to teach her riding. Yinxiang believes that Ruoxi has feelings for Yinzhen and that he is a passing fancy. Ruoxi, of course, cannot reveal that Yinzhen is to be the next emperor, which is why she so careful around him. Depressed by the situation, she returns to her estate to throw a tantrum. News of the eighteenth prince Yinxie's worsening illness arrives but the ministers feel that the emperor should concern himself with the affairs of the empire and advise against informing him of the prince's condition. However, Yinsi goes against the consensus and decides to inform him. Upon receiving the news, the emperor decides to decamp and return to the capital in three days. The crown prince, Yinreng, in a drunken stupor, trespasses into the Mongolian bivouac and is later scolded by the emperor. Yinreng believes that this incident was instigated by his elder brother and goes to demand an explanation from him. During the argument, he is told that it is only a matter of time before the emperor strips him of his title. Furious, Yinreng rushes to the emperor and erupts in a rage, further worsening the emperor's mood and endangering his succession to the throne. Shortly before the emperor's party reaches the capital, news arrives of Yinxie's passing. In his grief, the emperor confides to Ruoxi his reasons for doting Yinreng. From a young age, Yinreng had lost his mother and the emperor had personally taken a hand in his upbringing but age failed to bring wisdom. Late in the night, Yinreng again disturbs the emperor and, enraged, the emperor summons his ministers to pronounce Yinreng's misdeeds and decides to officially strip the crown prince of his right of succession upon returning to the capital. The stress of the rage overcomes him and the emperor faints.
9	"Episode Nine"	September 14, 2011
News of Yinreng losing his title rocks the capital and causes the ministers, fearing to side with the wrong prince, to speculate on who may be the new heir. All of them hope that the emperor retracts his command. The third prince, Yinzhi (Prince Cheng), arrives with news. He reports that the recent behavior of Yinreng may have been the work of the eldest prince, Yinzhi (Prince Zhi), and a search of his estate reveals drugs. Enraged, the emperor orders the life imprisonment of the prince. Upon Ruoxi's return to the capital, Yinti delivers a love letter written by Yinsi, which delights and startles her. She goes to Yutan's home to get news and discovers that there are people in the palace hoping to raise Yinsi to be heir. With her foreknowledge of history, she wants to write a letter of warning to Yinsi but knowing that history cannot be changed, she doesn't. Yinreng to beg forgiveness from the emperor and, again, with her foreknowledge Ruoxi knows that the emperor will forgive him but the time was not right. Another new year arrives; Yinzhen bestows on Ruoxi a gift of a Mulan necklace while Yinsi continues to write love letters, which greatly moves Ruoxi. Yinsi's supporters urge Ruoxi to reveal her discussions with the emperor but are firmly rebuked by Yinsi. Still believing that history is unchangeable, she tells Yinsi in passing that the emperor still loves Yinreng very much. She decides to write him a warning letter, but before she can deliver it to him, she encounters Yinzhen and during their conversation, Yinsi departs the court. Amongst the ministers, over thirty support Yinsi to be raised as heir. This leads the emperor to believe that Yinsi has raised a faction for personal gain and strips him of his title then leaves him to be dealt with by the government. He also warns the other brothers else, they would face the same fate and orders corporal punishment on Yinti for speaking up for Yinsi.
10	"Episode Ten"	September 14, 2011
In a bid to help Yinsi, Ruoxi begs the emperor to consider their paternal ties, but the emperor is unmoved. Yinzhen earns the ire of his mother for failing to help Yinxiang when the emperor ordered the punishment. Her anger leaves him deeply unhappy. Yinsi, saddened by the loss of his rank, seeks Ruolan to lessen his burden but she still treats him coldly. Therefore, he looks for Ruoxi instead but instead encounters Yinzhen and the two princes’ end up having tea together with Ruoxi. After a time, the turmoil of the Yinreng's loss of rank passes and his rank is restored, the other princes are also promoted and Yinsi is rehabilitated. Soon it is Ruoxi's birthday and Yin'e, in high spirits, wishes to celebrate her birthday but she only wants to see her sister, Ruolan. On her birthday, Ruoxi is sadly resigning herself to never being able to return to the present when she is summoned by one of the imperial concubines. Her summoning was actually organized by Yinsi so Ruoxi could see Ruolan. Upon seeing her younger sister, Ruolan asks if she has someone, she cares for and advises that she prepare for her own future. Yinti comes to find Ruoxi to chat and directly asks her if she has any feelings for Yinsi. Her evasion eventually angers Yinti but coincidentally Yinzhen and Yinxiang, who have been looking for Shouxing to have tea, appear. Yinzhen bears a gift from Ruoxi's childhood, nail polish. With the restoration of his rank, Yinreng resumes his immature behavior leading more officials to side with Yinsi. Fearing his growing influence, the emperor decides to take Yinsi with him to tour the empire while leaving Yinzhen to deal with court affairs. On his previous tour, the emperor remembered that Ruoxi had begun riding lessons and had left orders for her lessons to be continued. Unbelievably, the impulsive Princess Minmin volunteers, but it is not with the best intentions and during one lesson, she slaps rump of Ruoxi's horse startling it. Fortunately, the arrival of Yinsi prevented her from falling.
11	"Episode Eleven"	September 15, 2011
Yinsi is happy to know that Ruoxi likes him too, and both become couple. Back in the capital, Yinzhen demotes Yinsi's supporter positions on his father command.
12	"Episode Twelve"	September 15, 2011
After warning Yinsi, Yinti returns to capital and meets up with his fellow brothers. Knowing well Emperor's intention to stop 8th prince, Yinzhen advised Yinti (his brother of the same parents) to behave. Yinti tries to cover his tracks by pretending that he was ill in the capital while following Yinsi out of the capital to warn him. He is aided by Princess Minmin, who hides him in her tent after hearing a lie from Ruoxi that Ruoxi and Yinti are lovers.
13	"Episode Thirteen"	September 16, 2011
Afraid that Yinsi will meet a horrible fate, Ruoxi forces Yinsi to choose between his ambition and her love. Ruoxi does so with knowledge of the future, knowing that Yinsi will die in prison after Yinzhen seizes the throne after Kangxi's death. However, Ruoxi does not know if her actions then could change history. She and Yinsi do not meet each other for days until they return to the capital.
14	"Episode Fourteen"	September 16, 2011
Ruoxi gives Yinsi a strange warning, leaving him baffled. During the Chinese New Year, Ruoxi returns all the gifts and letters to Yinsi and Yinzhen. Yinsi is deeply wounded but Yinzhen finds it amusing.
15	"Episode Fifteen"	September 17, 2011
To save Yinti, Ruoxi bravely accepts a horse-racing challenge from Princess Minmin, who is enraged after learning that Ruoxi lied to her about she and Yinti being lovers. Yinti touched by Ruoxi action, decide to come clean about the matter to Yinxiang, Yinzhen's ally. However, as he see the close relationship between the two, he is filled with jealousy.
16	"Episode Sixteen"	September 17, 2011
When the Emperor assigns 4th prince to investigate the missing funds case, Yinzhen discovers that most proof are not in favor of Yintang the 9th prince. Yinzhen gave the evidence to 8th prince Yinsi so that he can warn Yintang about it. Unfortunately strong-headed Yintang didn't heed the caution, forcing both his brothers to report the truth.
17	"Episode Seventeen"	September 18, 2011
Crown prince Yinreng suddenly asked the Emperor for Ruoxi's hand in marriage. The news shocked all the princes who are close to her but are unable to help her openly.
18	"Episode Eighteen"	September 18, 2011
Yin'e informs his brothers that he wants to divorce his wife Mingyu after she beats him. Meanwhile, Yinzhen and Ruoxi both agreed to never tell each other lies. She took this opportunity to question Yinzhen's true desire.
19	"Episode Nineteen"	September 19, 2011
Thanks to Ruoxi effort, Yin'e and Mingyu reconcile. During a tea-break, Ruoxi pulls a prank on Yinzhen.
20	"Episode Twenty"	September 19, 2011
In the court, Kangxi Emperor accused Yinzhen for planning to overthrow Crown prince, a plot mastered in secret by Yinsi. Yinxiang steps forth to take the responsibility and is punished by ten years of solitary confinement. Ruoxi pleads the Emperor to show compassion on Yinxiang and kneels for days. Yinzhen accompanies her in the rain.
21	"Episode Twenty-One"	September 20, 2011
Kangxi Emperor strips the Crown prince title for good after which Yinzhen slowly withdraws himself from attending the court.
22	"Episode Twenty-Two"	September 20, 2011
The Emperor fondness for Yinti grew. The same cannot be said about Yinsi, he offended the Emperor and was penalized in a harsh way.
23	"Episode Twenty-Three"	September 21, 2011
Ruoxi strongly objects the Emperor order and received punishment. Everyone is stunned as to what has happened. Still, Yinzhen refused to help her. Ruoxi is demoted to the laundry department for defying the Emperor's order.
24	"Episode Twenty-Four"	September 21, 2011
The Great General Yinti and his victory at war, won the people's heart. But when he offered his hand in marriage to Ruoxi, she politely turns him down.
25	"Episode Twenty-Five"	September 22, 2011
Yinzhen became the new Emperor of China right after his father's death. All the other princes went into a bitter fight, strongly believing that it is not their late father's will. In fact, the late Kangxi Emperor had written in his will that the 14th Prince Yinti would ascend the throne after his death. Yinzhen then secretly hired officials to alter his father's will, such that it was he who would ascend the throne. Yinzhen and Yinti's mother is suspicious and berates him for plotting against his own brother.
26	"Episode Twenty-Six"	September 22, 2011
Ruling with an iron-fist, Yinzhen puts fear into his brothers and his enemies including his own mother, all for the sake to protect his newfound power.
27	"Episode Twenty-Seven"	September 23, 2011
Yinxiang was devastated when Luwu suddenly disappeared. Only Yinzhen and Ruoxi know that Luwu had drowned herself in a river. They kept the news from Yinxiang so as not to upset him further. Meanwhile, Ruoxi tells Chenghuan, the daughter of Yinxiang and Luwu, to kneel on a particular day of the year. She also tells Yinzhen that, when Chenghuan grows older, he must tell her that the day she has to kneel is really the death anniversary of her mother Luwu.
28	"Episode Twenty-Eight"	September 23, 2011
Upon hearing Ruolan's dying wish, Ruoxi begs Yinsi to divorce her sister so that she can reunite with her true love in her afterlife. Minghui helped Ruoxi to convince her husband.
29	"Episode Twenty-Nine"	September 24, 2011
Emperor Yongzheng (Yinzhen) continues to give Yinsi hard times. Ruoxi who protested his unreasonable act, decide to isolate herself, making Yinzhen miss her dearly. Witnessing Yinzhen's cruelty towards his brothers, Ruoxi begins to fear him instead of love him.
30	"Episode Thirty"	September 24, 2011
Yutan is accused by Yinzhen of plotting against him with the 9th Prince, and is placed into a large pot and steamed alive. Yutan's gruesome death sends Ruoxi into extreme shock, unaware that she is already with Yinzhen's child.
31	"Episode Thirty-One"	September 25, 2011
Minghui meets up with Ruoxi. Ruoxi realizes at last that, under a predestination paradox of time travels, of everything that happening due to her telling Yinsi to be wary of Yinzhen long ago, thus the future was never going to change by her actions but inadvertently she's shaping the future outcome of history as it is going to be written. Yinxiang finds Ruoxi on Yinzhen's orders. A depressed Ruoxi confesses that everything is her fault. She collapses and has a miscarriage. The imperial doctor tells Yinzhen that Ruoxi will never be able to bear children again. An angered Yinzhen orders Yinsi to divorce his wife. Yinsi refuses, to which Yinzhen replies that should he disobey orders, then his entire family will have to pay with their lives.
32	"Episode Thirty-Two"	September 25, 2011
Minghui begs Yinsi to divorce her but he refuses. After much grief, he agrees. Meanwhile, Ruoxi wakes up at last. Qiaohui tells her that Yinzhen was the one who looked after her while she was delirious. Yinzhen brings Ruoxi out for a walk in the garden. Ruoxi confesses to him that she is in fact, Zhangxiao from another era. She's afraid that one day, she might be forced to leave, just the way she was forced to arrive in the first place. Yinzhen reassures her that if she is ever forced to leave, he'll find her no matter where she is. Later, Ruoxi finds out that Yinzhen ordered Yinsi to divorce Minghui. With the help of Yinxiang, they convinced Yinsi to look for Minghui, but they were too late: Minghui had hung herself and burnt the house she was in. Mingyu sees Ruoxi and begs her to tell the Yinzhen to grant them death instead of continuously torturing them.
33	"Episode Thirty-Three"	September 26, 2011
Ruoxi wishes to leave the palace. Knowing that Yinzhen would not allow her to leave, Yinsi discloses details of his past romance with Ruoxi. An angered Yinzhen then allows Ruoxi to leave the palace. Ruoxi stays at the 14th Prince's residence.
34	"Episode Thirty-Four"	September 26, 2011
Knowing she's running out of time, Ruoxi tries to see Yinzhen one last time before she leaves this world. She writes a letter to Yinzhen, asking him to visit her one last time before her death. Due to a misunderstanding between Yinzhen and Yinti, the letter is thrown aside unopened. A weak Ruoxi then assumes that Yinzhen's absence confirms that his love for her has ended, and dies in grief and sorrow.
35	"Episode Thirty-Five"	September 27, 2011
Zhang Xiao returns to 2011, after waking up in a hospital from a coma for weeks. When she looks through history books, she finds that there are no traces of a person named Ruoxi, and wonders if her existence was just a hallucination. Zhang Xiao then visits the museum exhibit on Kangxi, and discovers a portrait of a woman in an ancient painting that resembled Ruoxi. Just as she turns around, so does a man with a strong resemblance to Yinzhen. He locks eyes with Zhang Xiao for a moment before he turns away. The man is speculated to be a modern-day reincarnation of Yinzhen. Zhang Xiao looks up in tears as the man leaves.

== See also ==
- Scarlet Heart
- Bu Bu Jing Xin
- Tong Hua (writer)
