= Scarlet Heart 2 =

Chinese television series

- Official poster
- Genre: Romance; Drama
- Directed by: Lee Kwok-lap
- Starring: Cecilia Liu; Nicky Wu; Sun Yizhou; Jiang Jinfu
- Opening theme: Step by Step by Mayday
- Ending theme: Dust by Jia Jia
- Country of origin: Mainland China
- Original language: Mandarin
- No. of episodes: 39 (original), 35 (DVD)

Production
- Producer: Karen Tsoi
- Production locations: China (Tianjin, Beijing, Ningxia, Hong Kong)
- Running time: 45 minutes per episode
- Production company: Chinese Entertainment Shanghai

Original release
- Network: Zhejiang STV
- Release: 22 April – 7 May 2014

Related
- Scarlet Heart

Scarlet Heart 2
- Traditional Chinese: 步步驚情
- Simplified Chinese: 步步惊情
Transcriptions
Standard Mandarin
- Hanyu Pinyin: Bùbù Jīngqíng

Scarlet Heart 2 (Chinese: 步步惊情) is a 2014 Chinese television series. It is the sequel to Scarlet Heart (2011), and continues the story after the time traveling protagonist, Zhang Xiao (Cecilia Liu), returns to her own time following the death of Ma'ertai Ruoxi. The story is not considered to be canon to Tong Hua's novel Bu Bu Jing Xin because the author never wrote a sequel, although some of the cast members from the first series have returned. Unlike its predecessor, the series does not involve time traveling and is set in the present, resolving the loose ends left by the first series' cliffhanger.

It began filming in Tianjin, China in March 2013 and ended in Hong Kong in June 2013. The series aired on Zhejiang TV from 22 April to 7 May 2014. Due to the restrictions on time-traveling dramas in mainland China, the 39 original episodes were cut down to 35 and re-assembled to 41.

== Synopsis ==
It has been three months since Zhang Xiao woke up from a coma and she can't forget about the Fourth Prince. One day, at the museum, she meets a man identical to him; he is Yin Zheng, the stepson of Zhentian Corporation's chairman. To find out his connection with the Fourth Prince, Zhang Xiao becomes a designer at Zhentian. Shortly after, however, an accident occurs and she loses her memories as Ruoxi. She starts to date a kind man named Kang Sihan, Yin Zheng's stepbrother; meanwhile, the latter dates Lan Lan, a model identical to Zhang Xiao who hides a mysterious past. Helped by his uncle, Yin Zheng wants to avenge the death of his biological father by ruining Kang Zhentian. Due to her connection with Sihan, Zhang Xiao finds herself unwittingly caught in the center of a power struggle.

== Cast ==
- Cecilia Liu as Zhang Xiao / Lan Lan
  - Chai Wei as Zhang Xiao / Lan Lan (child)
- Nicky Wu as Yin Zheng
  - Zheng Wei as Yin Zheng (child)
- Sun Yizhou as Kang Sihan
  - Bian Chen as Kang Sihan (child)
- Jiang Jinfu as Kang Siyu
- Damian Lau as Kang Zhentian
  - Huang You Ming as Kang Zhentian (young)
- Chen Xiang as Huang Di, Zhang Xiao's ex-boyfriend
- Ye Zuxin as Jack
- Yico Zeng as Ling Dang, Siyu's best friend
- Cai Yatong as Mo Xiaohe, Zhang Xiao's colleague
- Gan Yu as Zhang Zejiang, Zhang Xiao's father
- Ye Qing as Meng Xinyi, Zhang Xiao's best friend and Sihan's girlfriend
- Zhang Jiang as Zhou Yue, Sihan's best friend
- Annie Liu as Ma Yinuo
- Yin Zhuzheng as Yin Chenggui, Yin Zheng's uncle
- Zhao Chulun as Han Qing, Yin Chenggui's right hand
- He Yin as Zhao Lan, Yin Zheng's mother
- Wu Li as Qiao Qi, Yin Zheng's secretary
- Wang Zhifei as Yin Chengyi, Yin Zheng's father
- Deng Limin as Liu Donghai, director at Zhentian group
- Da Li as Wang Tiecheng, director at Zhentian group
- – as Xiao Hua, Zhang Xiao's biological father
- Cecilia Liu as Qin Yuzhen, Zhang Xiao's mother
- Gu Yan as Meng Yinan, Xinyi's mother

== Soundtrack ==
Scarlet Heart 2 Original Soundtrack 步步驚情 電視原聲帶

Soundtrack album by Various artists
- Released: April 25, 2014
- Genre: Mandapop
- Label: Produced by B'in Music; Distributed by Sony Music Entertainment Taiwan

Scarlet Heart 2: Original Soundtrack
No.	Title	Music	Length
1.	"Step by Step (步步)"	Mayday	04:33
2.	"Dust (塵埃)"	Jia Jia	05:27
3.	"Lose Myself (不在乎)"	Richie Jen	03:57
4.	"Stutter (結巴)"	Yen-j and Puff Guo	03:38
5.	"Second Love (身不由己)"	Ding Dang	04:16
6.	"Not About Kindness (無關善良)"	Victor Wong	04:40
7.	"The Miracle of Meeting Again (再續前緣)"	Ying-Hua Huang & Christof Unterberger	03:34
8.	"Which Chaotic Age Does Not Cause Goodbyes? (哪個亂世沒有離別)"		01:32
9.	"With Love As Passionate As the Skies (愛如穹蒼般壯烈)"		02:02
10.	"Do We Know Each Other? (我們認識嗎？)"		03:34
11.	"Go for You in Your World (去你的世界找你)"	Ying-Hua Huang & Christof Unterberger	02:43
12.	"Love and Not Forgetting (相依相愛難相忘)"	Ying-Hua Huang & Christof Unterberger	04:10
13.	"This Life (今生今世)"	Ying-Hua Huang & Christof Unterberger	04:29
14.	"Happiness of the Future (未來的幸福)"	Ying-Hua Huang & Christof Unterberger	03:02

== Ratings ==
- Highest ratings are marked in red, lowest ratings are marked in blue

CSM50 City Premiere Ratings
Original air time	Episode	Ratings (%)	Audience share (%)	Rank (timeslot)
2014.04.22	1-2	1.102	3.00	2
2014.04.23	3-5	0.899	2.55	3
2014.04.24	6-8	1.006	2.80	3
2014.04.25	9-10	0.998	2.70	4
2014.04.26	11-12	1.134	3.06	3
2014.04.27	13-15	1.179	3.24	3
2014.04.28	16-18	1.098	3.10	2
2014.04.29	19-21	1.208	3.40	2
2014.04.30	22-24	1.224	3.43	3
2014.05.01	25-27	1.170	3.44	3
2014.05.02	28-29	1.210	3.54	1
2014.05.03	30-31	1.136	3.11	3
2014.05.04	32-34	1.354	3.80	3
2014.05.05	35-37	1.442	4.10	1
2014.05.06	38-40	1.460	4.15	1
2014.05.07	41	1.418	4.27	1
Total	41	19.038	53.69	/
Average		1.1899	3.356	/

== Awards and nominations ==
Year	Award	Category	Nominated work	Result
2014	6th China TV Drama Awards	Actor with the Most Media Influence	Nicky Wu	Won
2014	6th China TV Drama Awards	Most Commercially Valuable Actress	Liu Shishi	Won
2014	6th China TV Drama Awards	Most Promising Actor	Sun Yizhou	Won
