= 10 Years Ticket =

2022 Thai television series

- Official series poster
- Thai: หนังรักเรื่องที่แล้ว
- Genre: Melodrama; Family drama
- Directed by: Kanittha Kwunyoo
- Starring: Pawat Chittsawangdee; Tontawan Tantivejakul; Jumpol Adulkittiporn; Benyapa Jeenprasom
- Country of origin: Thailand
- Original language: Thai
- No. of episodes: 16

Production
- Executive producer: Sataporn Panichraksapong
- Running time: 50 minutes
- Production companies: GMMTV; Nar-ra-tor

Original release
- Network: GMM25; TrueID
- Release: 14 December 2022 – 2 February 2023

10 Years Ticket (Thai: หนังรักเรื่องที่แล้ว; RTGS: Nang Rak Rueang Thi Laeo) is a Thai television series starring Pawat Chittsawangdee (Ohm), Tontawan Tantivejakul (Tu), Jumpol Adulkittiporn (Off), and Benyapa Jeenprasom (View). Directed by Kanittha Kwunyoo (Fon) and produced by GMMTV together with Nar-ra-tor, it was announced as one of the television series of GMMTV for 2022 during their "GMMTV2022: BORDERLESS" event held on December 1, 2021. It aired on GMM25 and TrueID from December 14, 2022, to February 2, 2023.

== Synopsis ==
Phukhao (Ohm Pawat) and Kongkwan (Tu Tontawan) are childhood friends whose lives are completely shattered when Lak (Riety Pahn), Kongkwan's sister, murders Mai (Pluem Purim), Phukhao's brother. The tragedy devastates both families; Phukhao loses his brother and parents, while Kongkwan's family faces intense social stigma following her sister's conviction. Ten years later, Phukhao remains driven by grief and continuously targets the innocent Kongkwan for revenge. His relentless anger splits their entire childhood friend group, forcing his closest friend to choose between supporting his payback or cutting ties with him entirely.

== Cast and characters ==
=== Main ===
- Pawat Chittsawangdee (Ohm) as Phukhao
- Tontawan Tantivejakul (Tu) as Kongkwan
- Jumpol Adulkittiporn (Off) as Plu
- Benyapa Jeenprasom (View) as Lookzo

=== Supporting ===
- Purim Rattanaruangwattana (Pluem) as Mai (Phukhao's older brother)
- Darisa Karnpoj (Riety Pahn) as Lak (Kongkwan's older sister)
- Pavarit Mongkolpisit (Bank) as Santi (Phukhao's father)
- Nicole Theriault as Sai (Phukhao's mother)
- Oliver Poupart (An) as Karn (Kongkwan's father)
- Narumon Phongsupap (Koy) as Veena (Kongkwan's mother)
- Amarin Nitibhon (Am) as Oh (Lookzo's father)
- Yong Chernyim as Yo (Plu's grandfather)
- Sansanee Wattananukul (Nid) as Pum (Plu's grandmother)
- Wanwimol Jaenasavamethee (June) as Nink
- Penpak Sirikul (Tai) as Pin
- Chalad Na Songkhla (Nueng) as Piak
- Chanagun Arpornsutinan (Gunsmile) as So
- Patara Eksangkul (Foei) as Champ
- Chanokwanun Rakcheep (Took) as Ying
- Pahun Jiyacharoen (Marc) as Chalee
- Sueangsuda Lawanprasert (Namfon) as Thanya (Mai's mother)

=== Guest ===
- Sunthari Chotipun (Nong) as Chalee's mother
- Himawari Tajiri as young Kongkwan
