= Annie Liu =

Hong Kong actress

- Liu in 2019
- Born: Annie Liu Fan-Ping; Yonghe, Taipei County, Taiwan
- Education: Emily Carr University of Art and Design
- Occupations: Actress; model
- Years active: 2005–present
- Spouse: Unknown (m. 2022)

Chinese name
- Traditional Chinese: 劉心悠
- Simplified Chinese: 刘心悠
Transcriptions
Standard Mandarin
- Hanyu Pinyin: Liú Xīnyōu
Yue: Cantonese
- Jyutping: Lau4 Sam1 Yau4
Southern Min
- Hokkien POJ: Lâu Sim-iu
- Tâi-lô: Lâu Sim-iu

Birth name
- Traditional Chinese: 劉凡平
- Simplified Chinese: 刘凡平
Transcriptions
Standard Mandarin
- Hanyu Pinyin: Liú Fán Píng
Yue: Cantonese
- Jyutping: Lau4 Faan4 Ping4
Southern Min
- Hokkien POJ: Lâu Hoân-pêng
- Tâi-lô: Lâu Huân-pîng

Annie Liu Sum-yau (Chinese: 劉心悠) is a Hong Kong–based Taiwanese actress.

== Background ==
Liu was born in Taiwan but was sent to Vancouver, Canada to study at a young age by her parents. In 2004, Liu was selected to feature in a TV commercial of China Airlines, the largest airline and flag carrier of Taiwan. Before starting her acting career in 2005, Liu studied industrial design at Vancouver's Emily Carr University of Art and Design.

Liu debuted as the female lead in the 2005 star-studded film, Mob Sister, and earned a Best New Performer nomination at the 25th Hong Kong Film Awards for her performance. Since her acting debut, Liu has moved to Hong Kong to pursue her acting career and has been leading several films and TV series. Although she focuses her career in the film acting, occasionally she would take on TV series acting and variety show hosting projects. She is currently running her own management company.

== Filmography ==
Year	Title	Role	Notes
2005	Mob Sister	Phoebe	Nominated — Best New Performer at the Hong Kong Film Awards
2006	Black Night: Next Door	Yi-tsan	
2007	Exodus	Ann Cheung	
2008	Shamo	Megumi	
2008	Taste of Happiness	Lam Mei-lan	TV miniseries
2008	I Do?	Summer Xia	TV drama
2009	L-O-V-E	Yun Xinyou	
2010	Kingfisher	Xiaoxin	
2011	Dreaming of the Deer and the Cauldron	Princess Jianning	Short film
2011	Scarlet Heart	Ma'ertai Ruolan	TV drama
2012	Floating City	Fion Wong	
2012	Natural Born Lovers	Bobo	
2012	Refresh 3+7	Wenting	TV miniseries
2013	Women of the Tang Dynasty	Meng Fu	TV drama
2013	4th Floor, Block B		
2013	Earth God and Earth Grandmother		
2014	Scarlet Heart 2	Ma Yinuo	TV drama
2014	Hungry Ghost Ritual		
2014	Grey Met Shrek		
2015	S for Sex, S for Secret		
2015	An Inspector Calls	A Worker	Cameo appearance
2015	Knock Knock! Who's There?		
2015	Guia in Love		
2016	My Wife Is a Superstar		
2017	All My Goddess		
2018	Deep in the Realm of Conscience	Yuen Yuet 元玥	Pairs up with Edwin Siu; TVB drama, main role
2018	Guardian Angel 2018 Web Drama	Dou Sum-yu 杜心茹	TV miniseries
2019	The Invincible Dragon	Wong Mung-kei	
2019	Always Miss You		
2019	A Witness Out of the Blue		
2020	The Grand Grandmaster	Chan Tsang	
2022	Inevitable	Siu Yee	ViuTV drama, main role

== Awards and nominations ==
=== 2018 ===
- 2018: (TVB Anniversary Gala) My Favourite TVB Drama Character (Singapore) Nomination (Deep in the Realm of Conscience)
- 2018: (TVB Anniversary Gala) My Favourite TVB Drama Character (Malaysia) Nomination (Deep in the Realm of Conscience)
