= Tontawan Tantivejakul =

Thai actress and model (born 2000)

- ต้นตะวัน ตันติเวชกุล
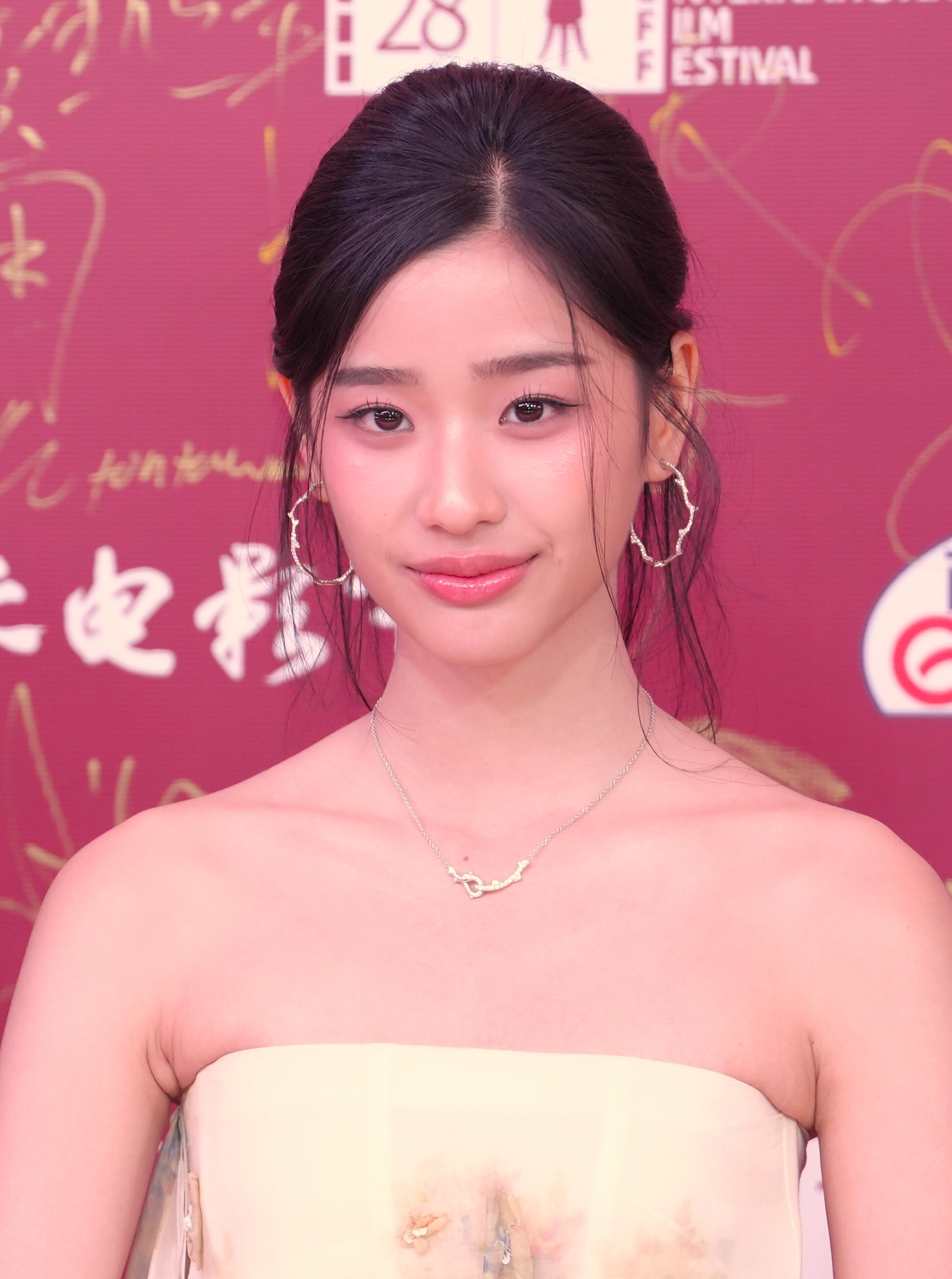
- Tontawan at 2026 Shanghai International Film Festival
- Born: 7 November 2000 (age 25); Bangkok, Thailand
- Other name: Tu Tontawan
- Education: Faculty of Dentistry at Chulalongkorn University
- Occupations: Actress; model
- Years active: 2020–present
- Agent: GMMTV
- Notable work: Gorya in F4 Thailand: Boys Over Flowers
- Height: 165 cm (5 ft 5 in)
- Relatives: Tonhon Tantivejakul (brother)
- Website: GMMTV Artist

Tontawan Tantivejakul (Thai: ต้นตะวัน ตันติเวชกุล; born 7 November 2000), nicknamed Tu (Thai: ตู), is a Thai actress and model. She gained widespread recognition for her debut lead role as Gorya in F4 Thailand: Boys Over Flowers (2021), a Thai adaptation of the Japanese manga Hana Yori Dango, which earned her international acclaim. In 2024, she made her film debut as Mui in the box-office hit How to Make Millions Before Grandma Dies. Beyond acting, Tontawan is a prominent figure in the fashion industry and serves as a brand ambassador for luxury brands including Dior and Puma Thailand. Her other notable television works include 10 Years Ticket (2022) and the historical series Scarlet Heart Ullavee (2026).

== Early life and education ==
Tontawan was born in Bangkok, Thailand. She is the younger sister of actor and musician Tonhon Tantivejakul. Her mother is a communication arts professor at Chulalongkorn University, and her father works in advertising.

She attended Srinakharinwirot University Prasarnmit Demonstration School for her elementary education before completing her secondary education at Chulalongkorn University Demonstration School. She balanced her early acting and modeling career while studying dentistry at Chulalongkorn University, graduating with second-class honors in 2025.

== Career ==
In 2020, at the age of 19, Tontawan appeared alongside Putthipong Assaratanakul in the music video for Waruntorn Paonil's song "Disappointed" (เหนื่อยใจ). Later that year, she signed a contract with GMMTV. In September 2020, she was officially announced as the female lead in the Thai adaptation of Hana Yori Dango manga, titled F4 Thailand.

Tontawan made her formal acting debut in December 2021, starring as Gorya in F4 Thailand: Boys Over Flowers alongside Vachirawit Chivaaree. The series, which also marked the acting debuts of Jirawat Sutivanichsak and Hirunkit Changkham, brought her international popularity and earned her several best actress awards.

In September 2022, she starred as Maki in Zero in the Moonlight, a segment of the romance anthology series Magic of Zero, reuniting with her F4 Thailand co-star Jirawat Sutivanichsak. Later that year, she starred as Kongkwan alongside Pawat Chittsawangdee in the drama series 10 Years Ticket, which premiered on December 14, 2022.

In February 2023, Tontawan made a guest appearance as Bee in the fantasy series Midnight Museum, a limited role she accepted while completing her dental studies.

"I would like to try every role that is different from what I've taken up in the past." – Tu Tontawan Tantivejakul

In July 2023, she collaborated with Jirawat Sutivanichsak for a third time, starring in the music video for (G)I-dle's "I Do: A Love Story in Bangkok".

In April 2024, Tontawan made her feature film debut in How to Make Millions Before Grandma Dies, portraying Mui, the cousin of the main character. She was also cast as the female lead in Scarlet Heart Ullavee, GMMTV's Thai television adaptation of the Chinese novel Bu Bu Jing Xin by Tong Hua.

== Endorsements ==
Tontawan is highly active in the fashion industry and frequently appears at events or in campaigns for major brands, including Burberry, Prada, Yves Saint Laurent, Louis Vuitton, Balenciaga, Ferragamo, Versace, Miu Miu, Kenzo, Gucci, Celine, Chanel, Loewe, Bottega Veneta, Adidas, and Bvlgari. She appears regularly in fashion publications such as Harper's Bazaar, L'Officiel Hommes, Mint and Vogue, and was featured in the inaugural issue of Grazia Singapore.

On September 20, 2023, Dior appointed Tontawan as its brand ambassador in Thailand. In March 2024, she was named a brand ambassador for Puma Thailand.

== Personal life ==
Tontawan is an avid traveler and photographer. She runs a dedicated Instagram account, @tuprefersyouwithgrain, where she shares her film photography. As of June 2026, her primary Instagram account had surpassed 5.9 million followers.

== Filmography ==
=== Film ===
Year	Title	Role	Notes	Ref.
2024	How to Make Millions Before Grandma Dies	Mui	Support role	
2026	Gohan	Jaidee	Main role	

=== Television series ===
Key
†	Denotes television productions that have not yet been released

Year	Title	Role	Notes	No. of episodes	Ref
2021	F4 Thailand: Boys Over Flowers	Thitara "Gorya" Jundee	Main role	16	
2022	Magic of Zero – Zero In The Moonlight	Maki	Main role	1 (Ep.2)	
2022	10 Years Ticket	Kongkwan	Main role	16	
2023	Midnight Museum: Ep.5	Bee	Guest role	2 (Ep.5,9)	
2026	Scarlet Heart Ullavee	Fongnuan / Na Boon	Main role	18	
TBA	Shooting Stars †	Darin	Main role	TBA	

=== Music video appearances ===
Year	Title	Artist	Ref.
2020	"Disappointed" (เหนื่อยใจ)	Ink Waruntorn	
2022	"Who Am I"; F4 Thailand	Vachirawit Chivaaree, Jirawat Sutivanichsak, Metawin Opas-iamkajorn & Hirunkit Changkham	
2022	"You Mean the World" (โลกของฉันคือเธอ); F4 Thailand	Fluke Gawin	
2022	"One Last Cry"; F4 Thailand	Violette Wautier	
2023	"When You Sleep" (ตอนเธอหลับ)	Mints	
2023	"I Do: A Love Story in Bangkok"	(G)I-dle	
2024	"Once I Had You" (ไม่เหมือนตอนมีเธอ)	Gam Wichayanee	
2024	"One More Chance" (รักเธอใหม่ได้หรือเปล่า)	MXFruit	
2026	"What's Wrong?" (ผิดมากไหม)	Nanon	
2026	"happy" (ดีใจที่ไม่มีเธอ)	BUS	

== Awards and nominations ==
=== Awards and nominations ===
Year	Award	Category	Work	Result	Ref.
2022	Kazz Awards 2022	Best Scene (shared with Vachirawit Chivaaree)	F4 Thailand	Nominated	
2022	Kazz Awards 2022	Rising Female of the Year	F4 Thailand	Won	
2022	MINT Awards 2022	Rookie of the Year	F4 Thailand	Nominated	
2022	HOWE Awards 2022	Shining Actress Award	F4 Thailand	Won	
2022	The 3rd Mani Mekhala Awards (2022)	Outstanding Female Rising Star	F4 Thailand	Won	
2022	GQ Men of the Year Awards 2022	New Face of the Year	F4 Thailand	Won	
2022	Content Asia Awards 2022	Best Female Lead in a TV Programme	F4 Thailand	Nominated	
2022	Asian Academy Creative Awards (AAA) 2022: National Winners	Best Actress of the Year	F4 Thailand	Nominated	
2022	27th Asian Television Awards	Best Actress in a Leading Role	F4 Thailand	Nominated	
2023	14th Nataraja Awards	Best Cast Ensemble	F4 Thailand	Nominated	
2024	28th Asian Television Awards	Best Actress in a Leading Role	10 Years Ticket	Won	
2024	Asia-Pacific Film Festival	Best Supporting Actress	How to Make Millions Before Grandma Dies	Nominated	
2025	Asia-Pacific Film Festival	FPA Asia-Pacific Rising Icon Award		Won	

=== Listicles ===
Name of publisher, year listed, name of listicle, and placement
Publisher	Year	Listicle	Placement	Ref.
Teen Vogue	2025	New Hollywood Class of 2025 (Note: New Hollywood's rising stars. These are the young celebrities shaping up to be the next generation of tastemakers.)	Included	
