= Mob Sister =

2005 Hong Kong film by Wong Ching-po

- Film poster
- Directed by: Wong Ching-Po
- Written by: Szeto Kam-Yuen; Jack Ng
- Produced by: Lawrence Cheng; Michael J. Werner; Wouter Barendrecht
- Starring: Karena Lam; Annie Liu; Eric Tsang; Anthony Wong; Simon Yam; Alex Fong
- Cinematography: Kenny Lam
- Edited by: Wong Ching-Po; Matthew Hui
- Music by: Tommy Wai; G-On
- Distributed by: Filmko Entertainment
- Release date: 4 August 2005 (Hong Kong)
- Running time: 90 minutes
- Country: Hong Kong
- Language: Cantonese

Mob Sister (Chinese: 阿嫂) is a 2005 Hong Kong action film, directed by Wong Ching-Po and starring Annie Liu as the titular character, Karena Lam, Simon Yam, Anthony Wong and Eric Tsang.

== Plot ==
In the macho triad world The only exception to the rule is the big boss' wife. Ah Sou tells the story of a girl who becomes appointed successor to Hong Kong's ruling triad. This role becomes a double-edged sword for the young heroine, who is sucked into a maelstrom of vicious gang wars, hair-raising assassination attempts and ruthless power struggles and betrayals. Through numerous violent episodes and unexpected reversals.

== Cast ==
- Karena Lam as Nova
- Annie Liu as Phoebe
- Eric Tsang as Gent
- Anthony Wong Chau-sang as Whacko
- Simon Yam as Tsan Gor (Chance)
- Alex Fong Chung-sun as Fa Gor (Buddy)
- Yuen Wah as Monk Tsang-sau
- Liu Ye as Heung Tung
- Liu Kai-chi as Ah Kau
- Him Law as Little Red Cap
- Tse Kwan-ho as Nova's assistant
- Lawrence Cheng as Boss Wang
