= The Invincible Dragon =

2019 Hong Kong film by Fruit Chan

- Theatrical poster
- Traditional Chinese: 九龍不敗
- Literal meaning: Kowloon the Invincible (Note: Kowloon is also the name of an area of Hong Kong that literally means "nine dragons.")
- Jyutping: Gau^{2} Lung^{4} Bat^{1} Baai^{6}
- Directed by: Fruit Chan
- Screenplay by: Fruit Chan; Jason Lam
- Produced by: Amy Chin; John Chong; Raymond Wong
- Starring: Max Zhang; Anderson Silva; Kevin Cheng; Annie Liu; Stephy Tang
- Cinematography: Cheng Siu-keung
- Edited by: Fruit Chan
- Music by: Day Tai
- Production companies: Pegasus Entertainment; Big Honor Entertainment
- Distributed by: Pegasus Entertainment
- Release date: 20 June 2019 (Hong Kong)
- Running time: 99 minutes
- Country: Hong Kong
- Language: Cantonese
- Budget: HK$150 million (US$12 million)

The Invincible Dragon (Chinese: 九龍不敗) is a 2019 Hong Kong crime action film directed and co-written by Fruit Chan, and stars Max Zhang, Anderson Silva, Kevin Cheng, Annie Liu, and Stephy Tang. The film follows a dragon-believing police detective (Zhang) investigating a serial murderer targeting policewomen which results in the death of his fiancée (Tang), as he hopes to enlist the dragon's help along the way.

The screenplay was conceived prior to Chan's 2014 film The Midnight After, with Pegasus Entertainment announced as the production company in 2016. Filming began in Hong Kong that year and subsequently moved to Macau, wrapping in February 2017. Post-production spanned around three years due to the extensive visual effects.

The film was theatrically released on 20 June 2019 in Hong Kong. It was a box-office bomb and received negative reviews, with critics criticizing the plot, characters, themes, action sequences, and special effects, some describing it as the weakest entry in Fruit Chan's filmography.

== Plot ==
Undercover police officer Kowloon concludes his mission to arrest mafia boss Uncle when they engage in a fight at a hotel. The violent altercation gets captured on video and posted online, leading to significant backlash. As a result, Kowloon's superior reassigns him to a remote police post in Yuen Long. Soon after, a serial murder case emerges in his new jurisdiction, targeting female police officers. Kowloon's superior promises to reinstate him if he solves the case, prompting Kowloon to set a trap using female subordinates as bait. Unfortunately, the murderer outsmarts the police and kills two officers, including Kowloon's fiancée, Fong Ning. Devastated by her death, Kowloon resigns and turns to underground boxing.

Years later, Chow, Kowloon's former partner, finds him and informs him of a serial murderer in Macau using similar methods to kill policewomen. Assigned to cooperate with the Macau police, Chow recruits Kowloon for the investigation, knowing he seeks revenge for Fong's death. Kowloon agrees and investigates one of the crime scenes, discovering a deflected bullet from a stolen Hong Kong police pistol belonging to his deceased colleague. When he plans to investigate the victims' homes, he realizes he is being followed by a woman. Chow also discovers he is being surveilled at his hotel. They decide to enlist the help of Kowloon's friend, Mung-kei, who quickly assists them in evading their followers. However, a Macau police detective, Tso, confronts them and reveals that he is the one who sent his men to monitor Chow. Upset with their unauthorized investigation, he sends them back to Hong Kong, but Chow's superior continues to press them to solve the case within an additional half-month.

Kowloon identifies the woman tailing him as Lady, a renowned personal trainer in Macau and the wife of Alexander Sinclair, a former American soldier-turned-boxer whom Kowloon fought before. Kowloon requests Chow's men to monitor Lady during her visit to Hong Kong, and they overhear a call revealing that Sinclair is behind the serial murders. However, when police raid Lady's mansion, she fiercely resists and fatally shoots Chow. Enraged, Kowloon pursues Lady, and they fight on a light rail, leading to an accident that causes the train to derail, resulting in Lady's death.

The following day, Kowloon receives a package containing Fong's corpse. Sinclair then confronts Kowloon, explaining his hatred for policewomen stems from losing a fight to Kowloon and the ensuing mockery by policewomen, which leads to his son's accidental death in a car crash. The two fight, with Kowloon gaining the upper hand, but Sinclair jumps out of a window and vanishes. Desperate, Kowloon prays to the nine-headed dragon from his childhood, asking for its aid if it is real.

Sinclair later calls Kowloon, falsely claiming he has abducted Wong. When Kowloon arrives at Sinclair's gym, Sinclair reveals he has lied and Wong is safe, but challenges Kowloon to a death match. As Sinclair struggles in the fight and attempts to flee on a speedboat, the nine-headed dragon answers Kowloon's call, blocking Sinclair's escape and dragging him back to shore. Although the police do not witness the dragon, Kowloon solidifies his belief and expresses his gratitude to it.

== Cast ==
- Max Zhang as Kowloon, an eccentric but marvelous Hong Kong police detective who believes in dragon and has his career ruined due to an overuse of violence
- Anderson Silva as Alexander Sinclair, an American retired soldier and Iraq War veteran who stages the serial murders of policewomen
- Kevin Cheng as Tso, a Macau police detective
- Annie Liu as Wong Mung-kei, a traditional Chinese doctor and the love interest of Kowloon
- Stephy Tang as Fong Ning, a former Hong Kong police officer and Kowloon's fiancée murdered years ago
- Endy Chow as Chow, a Hong Kong police officer and Kowloon's partner
- JuJu Chan as Lady, Sinclair's wife, personal trainer and partner-in-crime
- Hugo Ng as Superintendent Lai, Kowloon and Chow's superior
- Rachel Lee as Chun, a Hong Kong police officer and Chow's subordinate
- Lam Suet as Uncle, a mafia boss who falls victim to Kowloon

Also appearing in the film are Richard Ng as Wong Ping-cheung, Mung-kei's father; Houston Liu and Alan Wan as Tso's subordinates; and Carl Ng as Panther, Kowloon's deceased subordinate.

== Production ==
=== Development ===
The screenplay of The Invincible Dragon was first conceived seven to eight years prior to the production, predating director and writer Fruit Chan's 2014 feature film The Midnight After. Originally conceptualized as a police detective film, Chan wished to add more indie film elements to the project and turn it into a cult film, where co-writer Jason Lam proposed to include a dragon. Unlike Chan's previous films such as Three Husbands (2018), the nine-headed dragon in the film was an original design created by the production crew, rather than being adopted from any existing legend or folklore. Chan personally invited Stephen Tung to join the project as action choreographer, as he wanted the action scenes to be a selling point of the film, while Cheng Siu-keung served as cinematographer. The film was announced to be produced by Raymond Wong's Pegasus Entertainment with a budget of HK$150 million in October 2016, with Max Zhang, Louis Koo, Annie Liu, and Brazilian mixed martial artist Anderson Silva as the main cast, and the film would be shot in Hong Kong and Macau. Silva joined the film on an eight-figure paycheck. In November, Kevin Cheng was reported to replace Louis Koo. The film's English title was initially reported as Made in Kowloon.

=== Filming ===
Principal photography began on 30 October 2016. On 20 November, filming took place in Sai Kung. On 24 November, Annie Liu was reportedly injured her arm while filming a fight scene with Anderson Silva. Filming relocated to Macau in January 2017, with a scene shot at the headquarters of the Public Security Forces Affairs Bureau of Macau on 12 January. Since the building was restricted area and permission for filming was not applied, around ten members of the cast and crew including Fruit Chan, Kevin Cheng, and Alan Wan were apprehended by the Macau police. They were subsequently released at that night, but all their footage shot on that day were confiscated. Filming resumed on 15 January in Ho Man Tin, Hong Kong, as well as in Tin Shui Wai, where a fight scene was originally intended to be shot on Light Rail, but the crew did not receive permission, and had to build a 1:1 replica of a light rail train to shoot the sequences. Chan reapplied to shoot in Macau again afterwards, with a scene shot in a casino. Location shooting also included at The Venetian Macao and Macau Tower. Filming ultimately wrapped on 13 February.

=== Post-production ===
Due to an extensive amount of VFX effects and editing, post-production spanned around three years. The special effects were jointly handled by South Korea's Macrograph and Hong Kong's Different Digital Design. An official trailer was released in April 2019. Distribution rights in China were acquired by Bona Film Group in the same year.

== Release ==
The Invincible Dragon premiered at Cineart JP, Causeway Bay on 18 June 2019, followed by a theatrical release on 20 June in Hong Kong.

== Reception ==
=== Box office ===
The Invincible Dragon grossed a total of HK$1.32 million at the box office, which Oriental Daily News and Sing Tao Daily described as a box-office bomb.

=== Critical response ===
On review aggregator Rotten Tomatoes, 0% of 5 critics gave the film a positive review with an average rating of 4/10.

Elizabeth Kerr of The Hollywood Reporter criticized The Invincible Dragon for failing to fully exploit its sillier elements and become a "so-bad-it's-good" movie, while the heavy-handed post-production tinkering was unable to improve its commercial prospects, resulting in a confounding and messy film that lacks coherence and direction. Edmund Lee of South China Morning Post gave the film 2/5 stars, and bashed on the film's preposterous and bizarre mix of genres, convoluted plot, and unrealistic fight sequences that made the film an incoherent and disappointing effort. Lee also ranked the film 33rd out of the 37 Hong Kong films theatrically released in 2019.

Ed Travis of Cinapse lambasted the film for failing to utilize lead actor Max Zhang's talents, featuring a dreadful script, poor performances (especially from UFC star Anderson Silva), and unconvincing CGI that clashes with the attempted gritty Hong Kong action style, resulting in an overall confusing and unsatisfying film. Andrew Skeates of Far East Films also considers the film disappointing, as despite its "promising premise", it drowned under "unnecessary tedious drama" and failed to deliver the fun vibes and engaging action that the opening suggested.

Kau Si-pui, writing for HK01, observed that this film strayed away from director Fruit Chan's usual strength in political metaphors and character ensemble, instead turning into a formulaic action movie lacking logic and substance, which made the overall viewing experience subpar. Eric Liu of Wen Wei Po also noted that the film differed from Chan's directing style, lacking the politically metaphorical elements of The Midnight After (2014) or the aesthetic qualities of Three Husbands (2018), instead presenting a dull plot with unreasonable character motives and supernatural elements that left the audience confused. Ho Siu-bun, reviewing for Hong Kong Economic Journal, called The Invincible Dragon the lowest quality film in Chan's filmography, finding the weak character development, nonsensical plot points, and uninspired action sequences proved the cult film auteur would be unable to reliably produce commercial films that appeal to mainstream audiences.
