= Scarlet Heart Ullavee =

2026 Thai television series

- Official series poster
- Thai: ปาฏิหาริย์ข้ามกาลเวลา
- Genre: Historical fiction; Fantasy; Romance; Melodrama
- Created by: GMMTV; Nar-ra-tor
- Based on: Bu Bu Jing Xin by Tong Hua
- Screenplay by: Nuttiya Sirakornwilai; Muanfhun Chaonua; Chutimon Chinmart Reichel; Phoutida Nosavan
- Directed by: Kanittha Kwanyu
- Starring: Tontawan Tantivejakul; Metawin Opas-iamkajorn
- Theme music composer: Banana Record; Jaithep Raroengjai
- Ending theme: "Wherever, Whenever (ใจภักดิ์)" by William Jakrapatr
- Country of origin: Thailand
- Original language: Thai
- No. of episodes: 18

Production
- Executive producers: Sataporn Panichraksapong; Darapa Chaysanguan
- Producers: Nuttapong Mongkolsawas; Sita Vosbein; Kanittha Kwunyoo
- Production location: Thailand
- Cinematography: Tanai Nimcharoenpong; Weeranuch Laometakone; Theerapan Boossabong
- Editor: Sansuk Paradise
- Running time: 61–74 minutes
- Production companies: The One Enterprise; GMMTV; Nar-ra-tor

Original release
- Network: One 31
- Release: 4 November 2026 – present

Related
- Scarlet Heart (2011: China); Moon Lovers: Scarlet Heart Ryeo (2016: South Korea)

Scarlet Heart Ullavee (Thai: ปาฏิหาริย์ข้ามกาลเวลา, RTGS: Patihan Kham Kanwela, lit. 'Miracle Across Time') is a 2026 Thai historical fantasy television drama series starring Tontawan Tantivejakul and Metawin Opas-iamkajorn, based on the 2005 Chinese novel Startling by Each Step (Chinese: 步步驚心) by Tong Hua. The series is directed by Kanittha Kwanyu and produced by GMMTV and Nar-ra-tor.

The series premiered on One 31 on 4 November 2026, airing on Wednesdays and Thursdays at 20:30 ICT. It was made available for streaming at 21:45 ICT on the OneD app.

== Synopsis ==
Transported through time by a mysterious sequence of events, Na Boon (Tontawan Tantivejakul) from the modern era finds herself awakened within the body of Fong Nuan, a young noblewoman living in Ullavee, an ancient kingdom bordering China, Lan Na and Myanmar. As she struggles to adapt to the unfamiliar customs and social norms of the era, she becomes embroiled in a fierce power struggle among rival princes vying for the throne. Amid court intrigues and shifting alliances, she finds herself increasingly drawn to the princes, navigating the delicate balance between romance and the perils of court politics.

== Cast and characters ==
=== Main ===
- Tontawan Tantivejakul (Tu) as Fong Nuan (Ullavee) / Na Boon (present)
- Metawin Opas-iamkajorn (Win) as Prince Mueang Fah
- Korapat Kirdpan (Nanon) as Saen Thep, Prince Rajawongse
- Tawan Vihokratana (Tay) as Indraraja, Viceroy prince
- Nattawat Jirochtikul (Fourth) as Jom Harn, Prince Rajaputra
- Phuwin Tangsakyuen (Phuwin) as Prince Fah Haam
- Tanapon Sukumpantanasan (Perth) as Kong Tai, Prince Buriratana
- Jiratchapong Srisang (Force) as Pha Wiang, Viceroy prince of Meng Mang (Ullavee) / Bew (present)

=== Supporting ===
- Pansa Vosbein (Milk) as Princess Hong Kham
- Chanikarn Tangkabodee (Prim) as Bua Sai
- Nachcha Chuedang (Parn) as Dao Kaew
- Rutricha Phapakithi (Ciize) as Lha (Ullavee) / Eva (present)
- Sarunchana Apisamaimongkol (Aye) as Maneethip
- Songsit Roongnophakunsri (Kob) as Sovereign Prince Chai Saen Lue
- Apasiri Nitibhon (Um) as Royal Consort Sukhantha
- Rasee Wacharapolmek (Organ) as Royal Consort Chiang La-or
- Pitisak Yaowananont (Tae) as Seer Phrommaya
- Sueangsuda Lawanprasert (Namfon) as Lady Homjan
- Napasranch Mittiraroch (Tuck) as Muen In

=== Guest ===
- Leo Saussay as Na Boon's project leader
- Thishar Thurachon (Mint) as Nam Nang
- Wongravee Nateetorn (Sky) as In Saeng

== Soundtrack ==
Scarlet Heart Ullavee Soundtrack
No.	Title	Writer(s)	Artist	Length
1.	"Wherever, Whenever" (ใจภักดิ์)	Amp Achariya Dulyapaiboon	William Jakrapatr	4:11

== Production ==
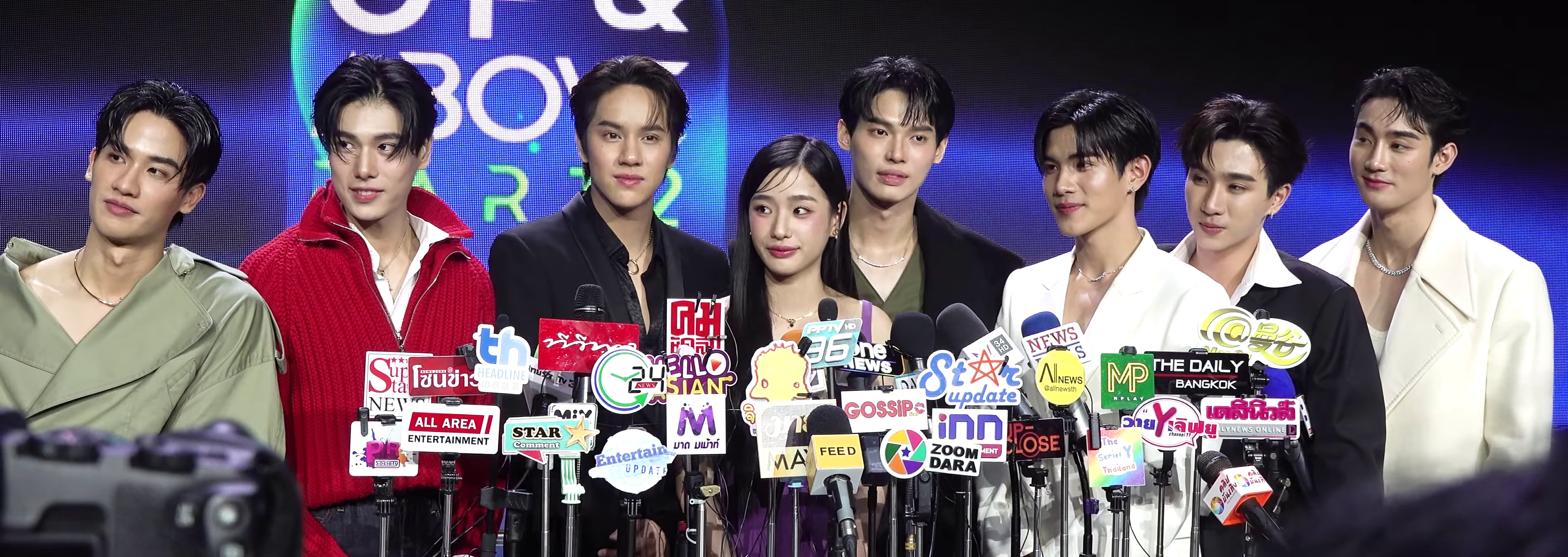
The main cast at the GMMTV 2024 Up & Above Part 2 event on 23 April 2024.

Scarlet Heart Ullavee is the third television adaptation of Startling by Each Step from the web novel by Tong Hua. It was first adapted into the Chinese series Scarlet Heart in 2011, starring Cecilia Liu and Nicky Wu, and later into the South Korean series Moon Lovers: Scarlet Heart Ryeo in 2016, starring Lee Ji-eun and Lee Joon-gi. The Thai adaptation was announced on 23 April 2024 at the GMMTV Up & Above Part 2 event held at Union Hall, Union Mall, where the network revealed the main cast and a minute-long video trailer. Pre-production began later that year, and in September the cast undertook training in horse riding, archery, traditional dance, and sword combat to prepare for their roles. The first script read-through was held on 19 May 2025. Principal photography began on 26 August 2025.

== Cultural controversy ==
The series sparked controversy and criticism among Myanmar audiences following the release of its official trailer and promotional images. The costumes and dance performances featured in the series were criticized for resembling royal court attire from Myanmar's Konbaung dynasty and Yadanabon periods, particularly Htaingmathein blouses and garments featuring puffed sleeves. The perceived similarities prompted widespread debate and discussion about cultural representation and heritage among Myanmar viewers.

Some dance performances in the series were also criticized for bearing strong similarities to the Rakhine traditional oil-lamp dance performed during Buddhist ceremonial celebrations. Concerned that international audiences might mistakenly identify elements of Myanmar's cultural heritage as exclusively Thai traditions, Myanmar fans called on GMMTV to clearly acknowledge the origins of the cultural elements used in the series and issue an official explanation. On 20 October 2026, DatarrX Foundation launched an online petition calling for recognition of Myanmar's cultural heritage. By 23 October 2026, the petition had gathered more than 34,000 signatures.

Following the growing criticism, GMMTV issued an official statement on 23 October 2026. The production company clarified that Ullavee is a fictional city created specifically for the series. The fictional city was set in a region that lies between Lanna, China and Myanmar. Inspiration for the costumes and artistic designs were drawn from several cultural traditions and artistic heritage in the region, including those of the Lanna people of Northern Thailand, Tai peoples, as well as those of Chinese and Myanmar origins.

GMMTV further stated that it had no intention of portraying all elements of the series as exclusively representative of Thai culture. The company emphasized its respect for the value and origins of each culture and apologized for the concerns and distress caused among audiences by the cultural representations in the series. To avoid confusion, GMMTV renamed the series from Scarlet Heart Thailand to Scarlet Heart Ullavee, highlighting that it is a fictional historical drama and has no connection to real Thai historical events.
