= Christof Unterberger =

Austrian cellist and composer (born 1970)

Christof Unterberger (born 1970 in Bregenz, Austria) is an Austrian cellist, composer, arranger, and record producer.

== Life and education ==
Unterberger received his first cello lessons at the Graz Conservatory. He continued his studies at the University of Music and Performing Arts Graz and from 1991 to 1995 studied at the Conservatoire National Supérieur de Musique de Paris with Klaus Heitz and Philippe Muller, where he earned a concert diploma in cello.

== Career ==
Unterberger works as a cellist and as a composer for film and media music. According to mica – music austria, he was primarily active as a soloist and also held engagements with chamber orchestras in Austria and abroad.

Among his early film and media music works are Stabat (2005), I Love in You (2007), Der Anschlag (2010), and Un nuovo Regno (2011).

Later credits include Condor's Nest (2023) and The Other 300: Army of Lovers, 2025).

In 2021, he contributed arrangements to the ORF III concert film The Great American Songbook with Camilla Nylund, a project initiated by André Heller.

== Pars Momentum ==
Unterberger is part of the duo Pars Momentum together with Christian Heidenbauer.

== Awards ==
- Moondance Columbine Award (2006)
- Best Film Score at the Dervio Film Festival (2006)
- Second prize at Peter Gabriel's RealWorld Remixed Award (2007)
- Second prize at the Vienna Film Music Award (2009)
- Honorary Prize of the University of Music and Performing Arts Vienna (2010)
- First prize at the Vienna Film Music Award (2010)

== Teaching ==
Unterberger teaches media music at Jam Music Lab Private University in Vienna. Since 2021, he has also led the masterclass "Orchestral Programming" at the Popakademie Baden-Württemberg in Mannheim.
