= Moon Lovers: Scarlet Heart Ryeo =

2016 South Korean television series

- Promotional poster
- Hangul: 달의 연인 – 보보경심 려
- Hanja: 달의 戀人 – 步步驚心 麗
- RR: Darui yeonin – bobogyeongsim ryeo
- MR: Tarŭi yŏnin – pobogyŏngsim ryŏ
- Genre: Historical fiction; Romance; Fantasy; Melodrama
- Based on: Bu Bu Jing Xin by Tong Hua
- Written by: Cho Yoon-young
- Directed by: Kim Kyu-tae
- Starring: Lee Joon-gi; Lee Ji-eun; Kang Ha-neul
- Country of origin: South Korea
- Original language: Korean
- No. of episodes: 20 + 2 specials

Production
- Executive producers: Jo Jung-ho; Yang Min-suk; Kim Kyu-tae
- Producer: Baek Choong-hwa
- Cinematography: Kim Cheon-suk; Park Jang-hyuk; Lee Sang-su
- Editors: Kim Hyang-suk; Lee Hyun-ju
- Camera setup: Single-camera
- Running time: 60 minutes
- Production companies: BaramiBunda Inc. (Note: The production company behind the 2013 SBS drama That Winter, the Wind Blows (Geu gyeo-ul, baram-i bunda), which was also directed by Kim Kyu-tae.); GT Entertainment (Note: Kim Kyu-tae's production company.); NBCUniversal International Television; YG Entertainment
- Budget: US$13 million

Original release
- Network: SBS TV
- Release: August 29 – November 1, 2016

Related
- Scarlet Heart; Scarlet Heart Ullavee

Moon Lovers: Scarlet Heart Ryeo (Korean: 달의 연인 – 보보경심 려) is a South Korean television series based on the Chinese novel Bu Bu Jing Xin by Tong Hua. It aired from August 29 to November 1, 2016, on SBS, every Monday and Tuesday at 22:00 (KST), for 20 episodes. The series received mixed reviews from critics. It recorded an average nationwide viewership rating of 7.6% per Nielsen Korea and 7.3% per TNMS, and was considered a failure against its US$13 million production budget.

== Synopsis ==
During a total solar eclipse, a 25-year-old 21st-century woman, Go Ha-jin (Lee Ji-eun), is transported back in time, to the Goryeo period. She wakes up in the year of 941, in the body of Hae Soo, among the many princes of the ruling Wang family, during the reign of King Taejo. She initially falls in love with the gentle and warm-hearted 8th Prince Wang Wook (Kang Ha-neul), but later develops a relationship with Wang So (Lee Joon-gi), the fearsome 4th Prince, who hides his face behind a mask and is given the derogatory label of "wolf-dog". As the story develops, Hae Soo finds herself unwittingly caught up in the palace politics and the rivalry among the princes, as they fight for the throne.

== Cast ==
=== Main ===
- Lee Joon-gi as 4th Prince Wang So
  - Hong Dong-young as young Wang So

Initially known as the cruel and aloof one among the princes, he is both feared and misunderstood by those around him. He begins to change because of Hae Soo, who quickly realizes that his coldness is a front to hide his pain.

- Lee Ji-eun as Go Ha-jin / Hae Soo

A 21st century girl who has had a painful life. She travels back in time to 10th century Goryeo. She is an optimistic girl and can't stand injustice. She becomes the first one to understand Wang So's pain and decides to help him. She cares deeply for her loved ones. She initially develops feelings for the 8th Prince, but later falls for the 4th Prince.

- Kang Ha-neul as 8th Prince Wang Wook

A good man who cares deeply for the people around him. His kind charms make Hae Soo fall for him. However, his position places him as a rival to Wang So for both love and the throne.

=== Supporting ===
==== Princes ====
- Kim San-ho as Crown Prince Wang Mu

The oldest prince.

- Hong Jong-hyun as 3rd Prince Wang Yo

The clever and ambitious older brother of Wang So who has his eyes on the throne.

- Yoon Sun-woo as 9th Prince Wang Won

A conceited, proud, and narcissistic royal who aids Yo and Wook in their pursuit for the throne.

- Byun Baek-hyun as 10th Prince Wang Eun

A mischievous and playful royal with a lively but annoyingly childish personality who becomes Hae Soo's first friend in Goryeo.

- Nam Joo-hyuk as 13th Prince Wang Baek-ah

One of Hae Soo's friends and a romantic playboy is known for his refined and aristocratic manners. He is very good-looking and has a deep love for music and arts.

- Ji Soo as 14th Prince Wang Jung

The youngest Prince who has a crush on Hae Soo and befriends her, also stays by her side until she dies. As per her last wish, Wang Jung then raises Hae Soo and Wang So's daughter.

==== Goryeo Imperial family ====
- Jo Min-ki as Wang Geon, King Taejo

Founder of the Goryeo Dynasty.

- Park Ji-young as Queen Yoo

Taejo's 3rd Queen and a mother to Wang Yo, Wang So and Wang Jung.

- Jung Kyung-soon as Queen Hwangbo

Taejo's 4th Queen and mother of Wang Wook and Princess Yeon-hwa. She was accused of causing Court Lady Oh's miscarriage.

- Kang Han-na as Princess Yeon-hwa

Wang Wook's full younger sister and Wang So's future wife.

==== Women around the princes ====
- Park Si-eun as Lady Hae Myung-hee

Wang Wook's wife and Hae Soo's sixth cousin.

- Jin Ki-joo as Chae-ryung

Hae Soo's servant and friend, who loves the 9th Prince, Wang Won.

- Seohyun as Woo-hee

A gisaeng, who is the last Princess of Later Baekje and Baek-ah's lover.

- Ji Hye-ran as Park Soon-deok

Park Soo-kyung's daughter and Wang Eun's wife.

=== Others ===
- Kim Sung-kyun as Choi Ji-mong

The king's astronomer. Crown Prince Wang Mu's friend.

- Sung Dong-il as Grand General Park Soo-kyung

Soon-deok's father and Wang So's right-hand man.

- Woo Hee-jin as Court Lady Oh Soo-yeon

Head of the Damiwon Palace, King Taejo's one true love and Hae Soo's mentor, who is a mother-like figure to her.

- Choi Byung-mo as Park Young-gyu, Wang Yo's father-in-law
- Park Jung-hak as Wang Sik-ryeom, King Taejo's cousin
- Kim Kang-il as a member of the Shinju Kang clan

=== Special appearances ===
- Byeon Woo-seok as Go Ha-jin's ex-boyfriend (Ep. 3)
- Jang Hae-min as Go Ha-jin's friend (Ep. 3)
- Park Kwi-soon as the Chief Monk of the temple where the tongueless monks reside (Ep. 3)
- Oh Yoo-mi as court lady (Ep. 10)
- Jang Seo-hee as Lady Gyeonghwa

Crown Prince Wang Mu's daughter who later become Wang So's second wife and consort (Ep. 14)

- Seo Eun-sol as Hae Soo and Wang So's daughter (Ep. 20)
- Kim Do-hye as Bok-soon, Wang Wook's daughter (Ep. 20)

== Production ==
=== Development ===
On June 25, 2015, director Kim Kyu-tae and his production company, BaramiBunda Inc., announced that they were in the early stages of making a Korean version of the Chinese novel Bu Bu Jing Xin by Tong Hua. YG Entertainment and NBC Universal invested in the series, with the latter covering half of the budget of ₩15 billion.

The Chinese streaming platform Youku bought Moon Lovers at $400,000 per episode, making it the most expensive Korean drama ever sold, surpassing the records previously set by Descendants of the Sun (2016) and Uncontrollably Fond (2016), which were sold to China for $250,000 per episode. The record was beaten a few months later by Man to Man (2017).

=== Casting ===
On November 11, 2015 it was announced that Lee Joon-gi had been offered the male lead part of Wang So. The actor confirmed his participation in the project on January 4, 2016, and the same day it was announced that singer-actress Lee Ji-eun had accepted the part of the female lead. The first script reading took place four days later.

=== Production ===
The jewels in the drama were all created by Jung Jae-in of Minhwi Art Jewelry, and Lee Ji-eun herself designed the hairpin with the peony gifted by Wang So to the female lead. Artist Lee Hoo-chang designed and supervised the production of the over one hundred masks for the drama.

=== Filming ===
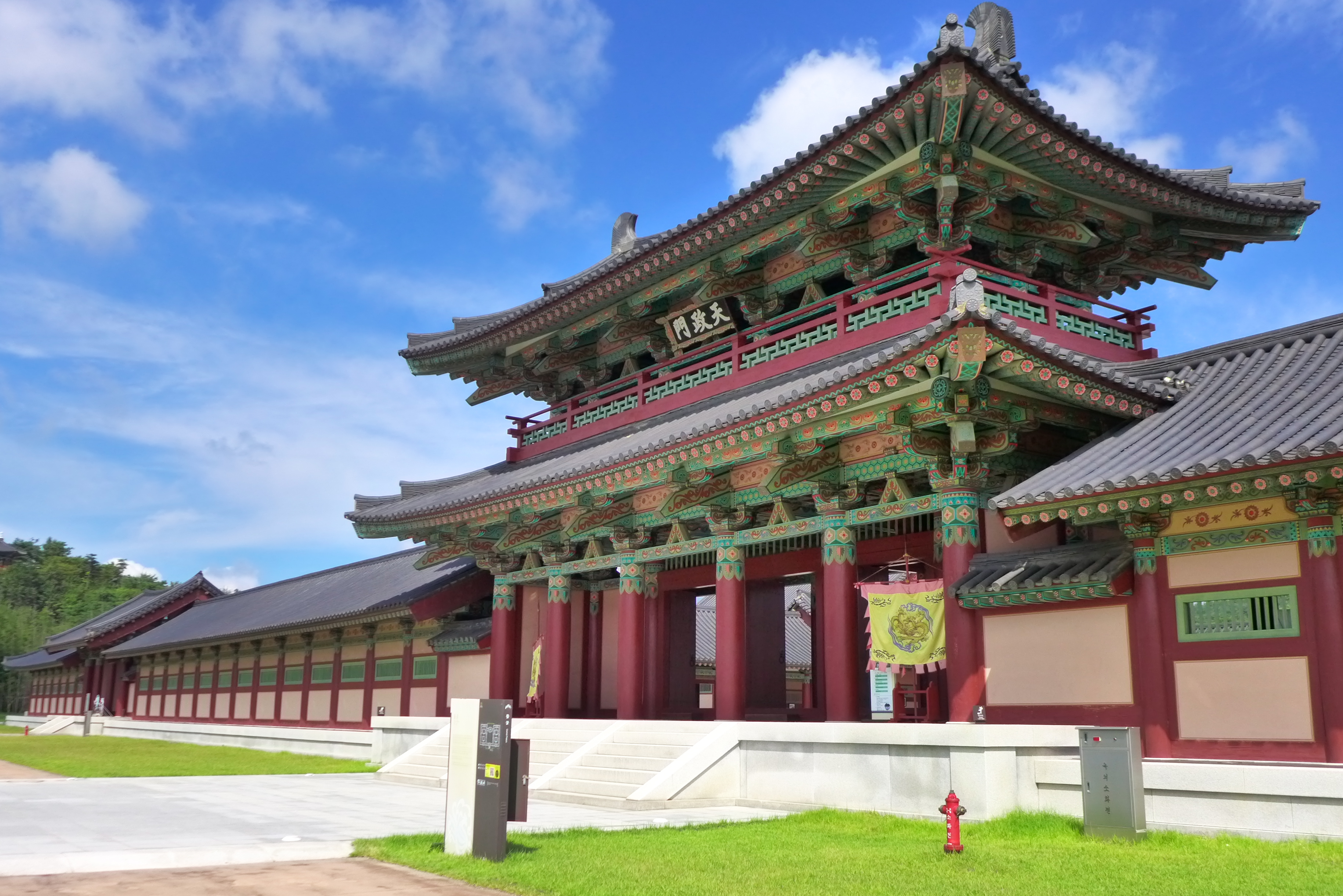
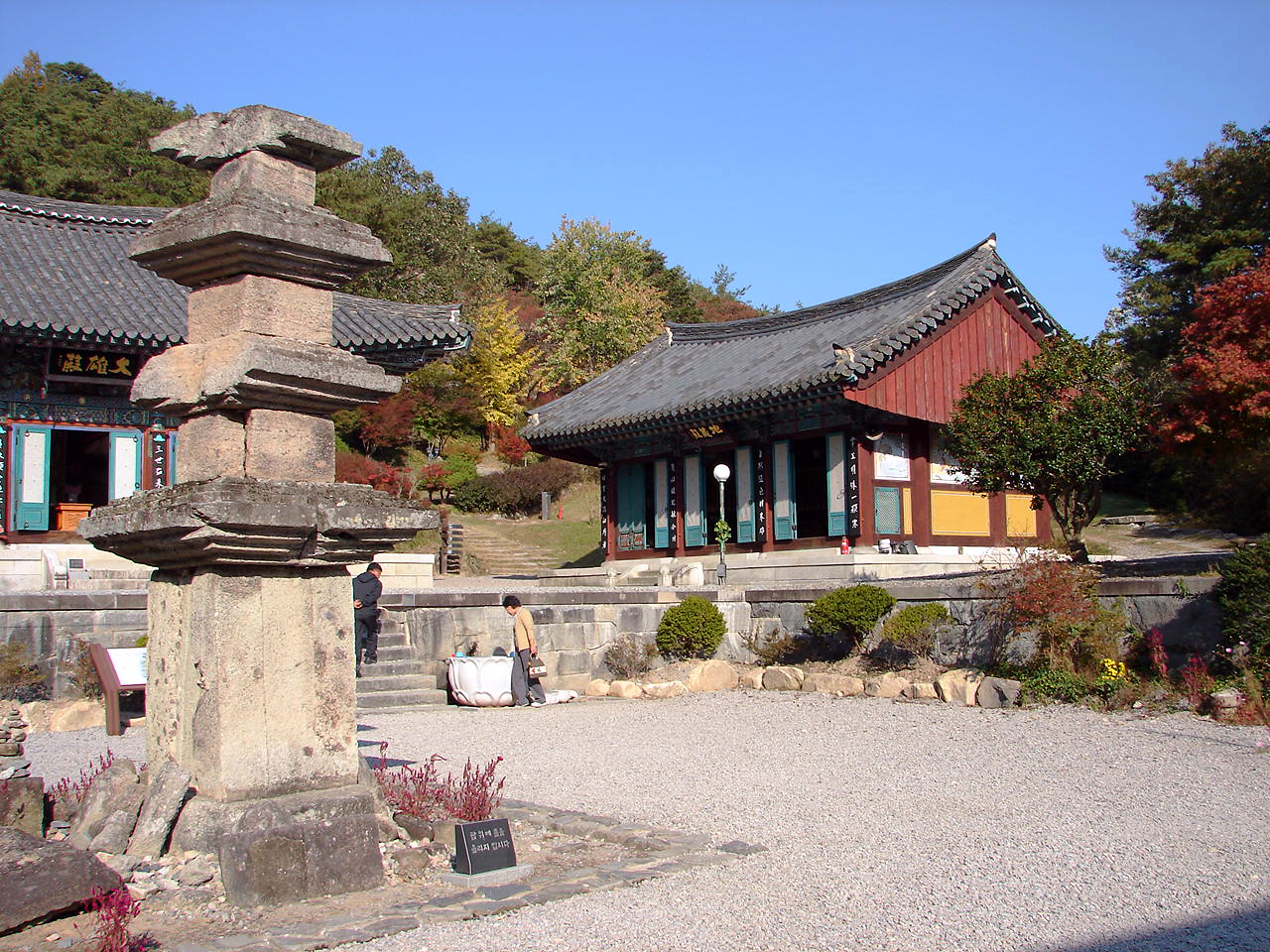
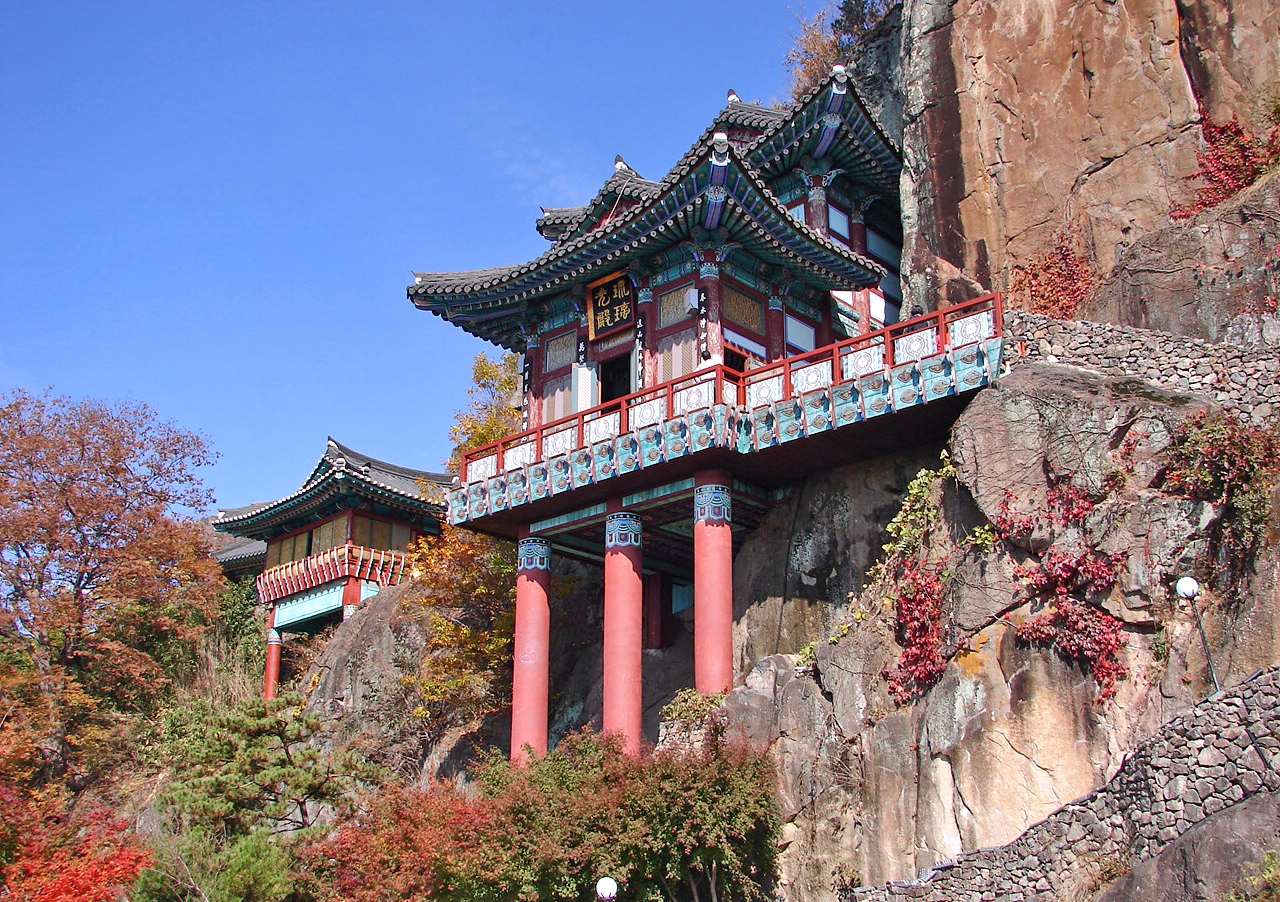
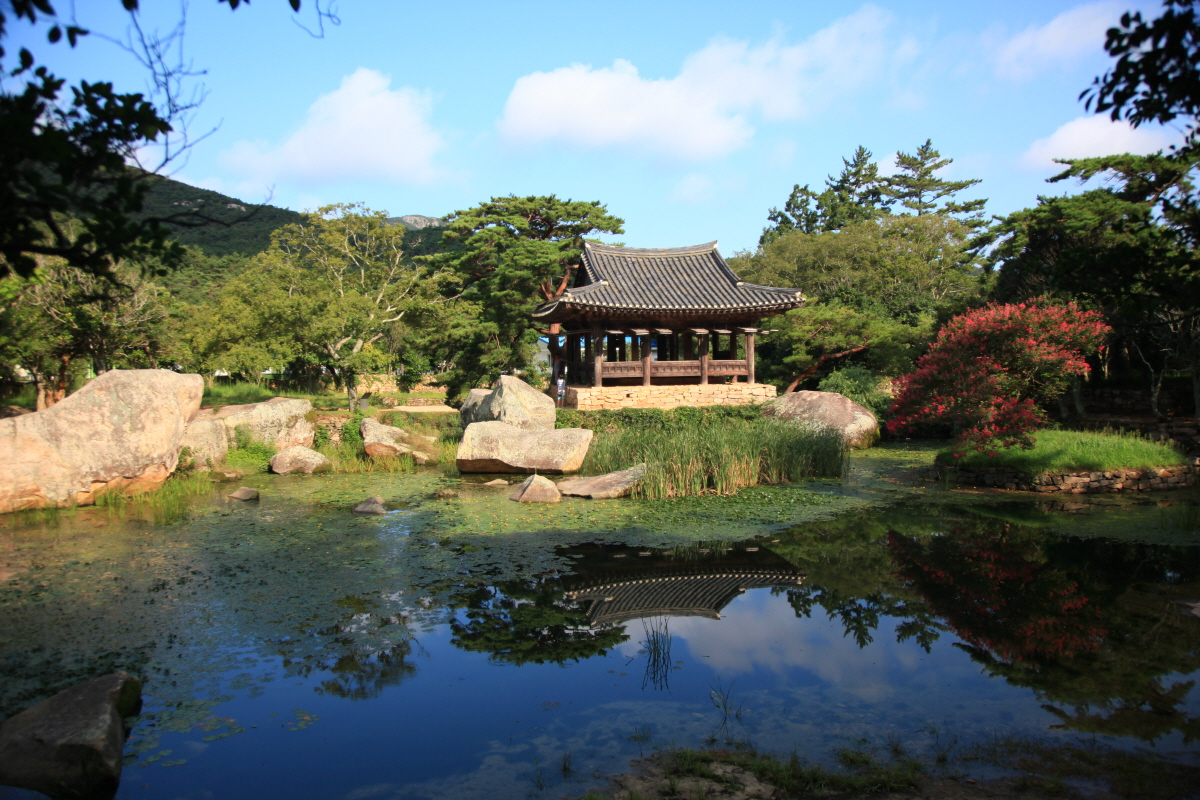
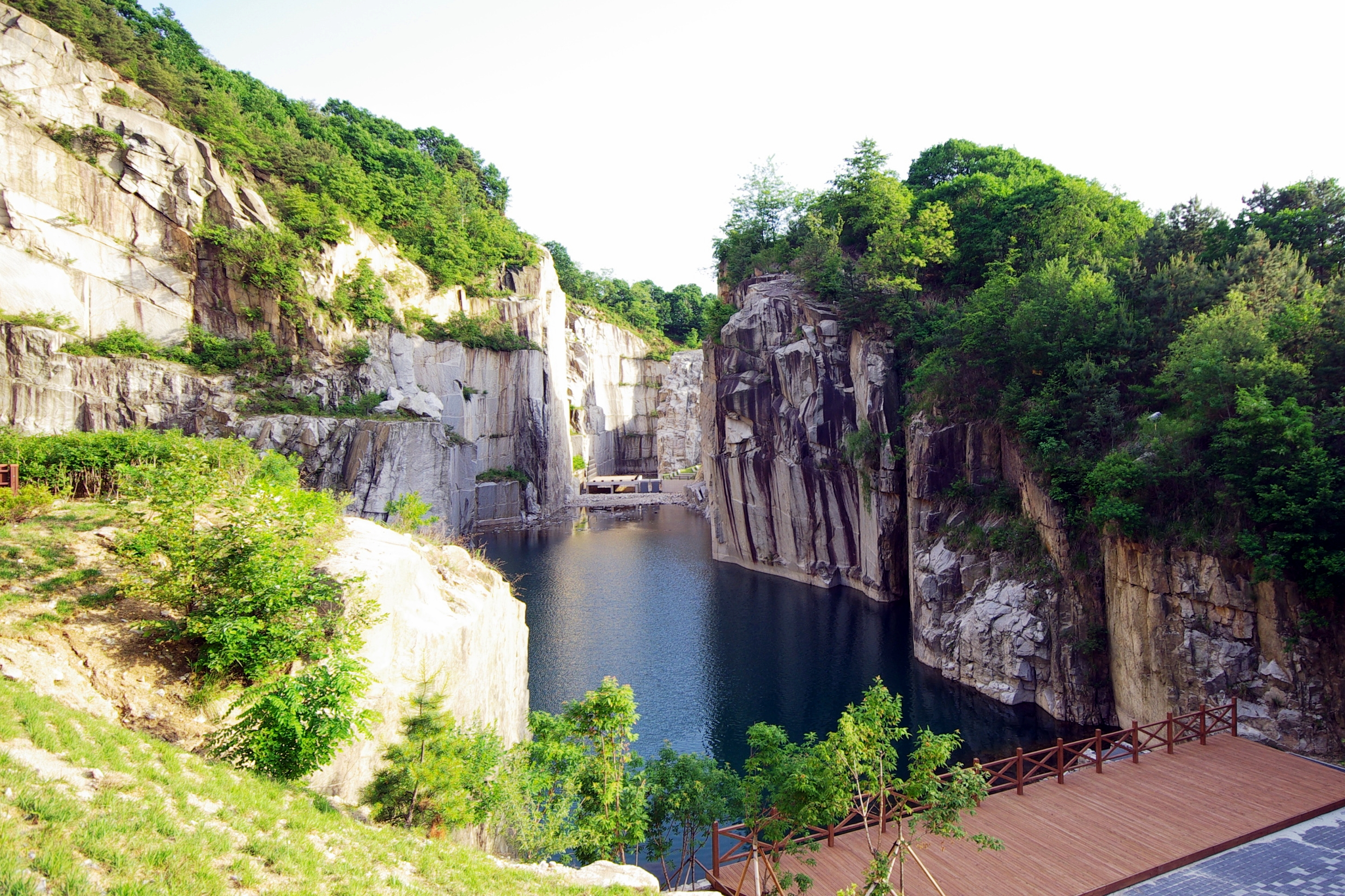
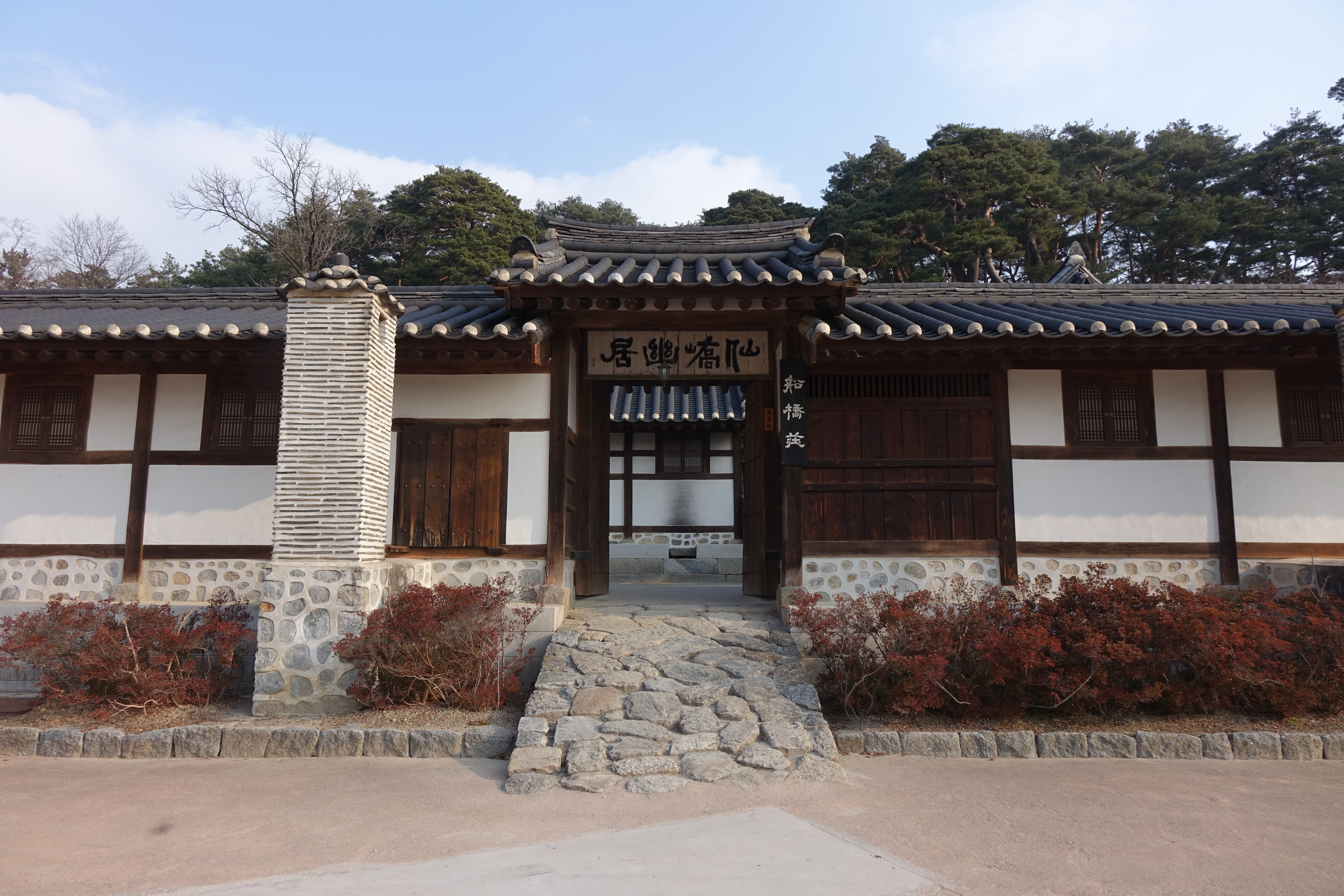
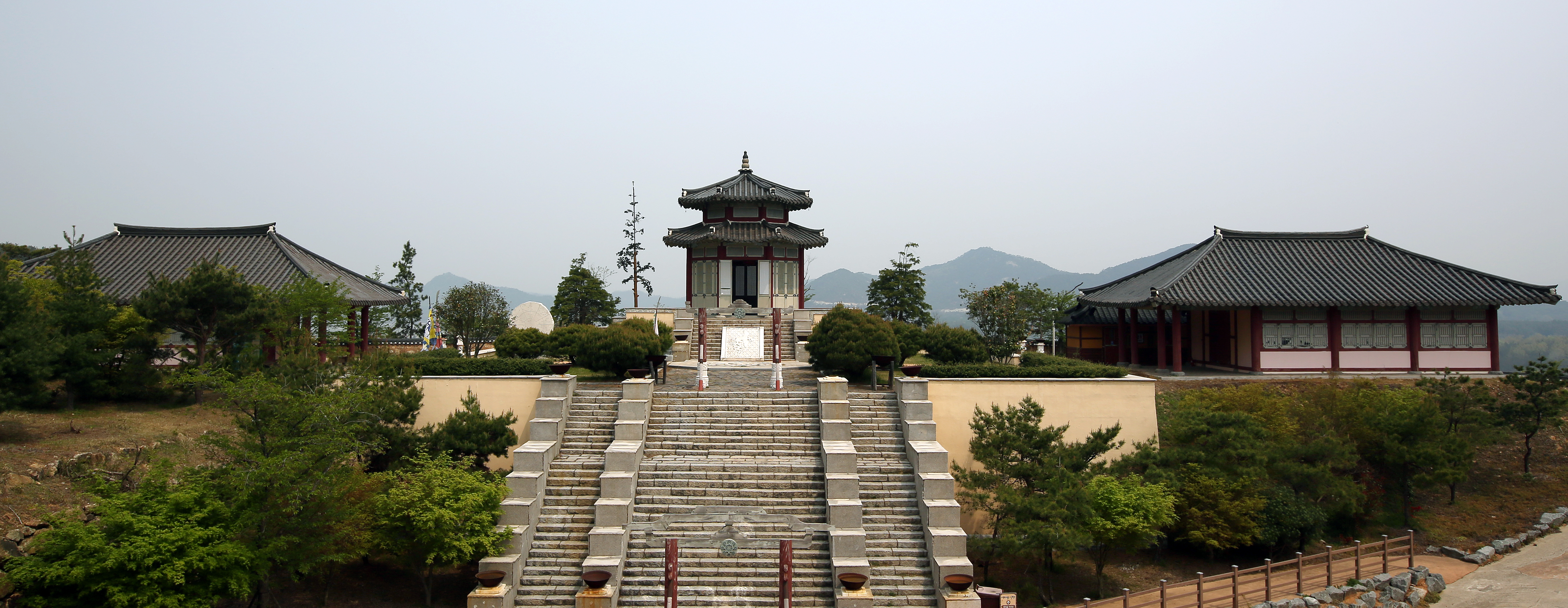
From top left: Baekje Cultural Center, Unjusa temple; Saseong-am hermitage; Seyeonjeong pavilion, Pocheon Art Valley, Seon-gyojang mansion, the Naju Image Theme Park

Filming, which lasted five months, began in February 2016 at the Yoseonjeong pavilion and the Yoseon-am rocks in Yeongwol County, Gangwon Province, ending in the early hours of July 1, when Lee Ji-eun filmed her last scene from episode 20. Lee Joon-gi ended his part on June 30 on the set in Icheon, Gyeonggi Province.

Other locations include Baekje Cultural Center, Naju Image Theme Park, Ondal Tourist Park in Danyang County, North Chungcheong; Unjusa and Man-yeonsa temples in Hwasun County; Saseong-am Hermitage on Mount Osan in Gurye County; Wolhwawon garden in the Hyowon park in Suwon; Seyeonjeong pavilion on Bogil island, Cheonjuho lake in the Pocheon Art Valley, Miryang lake, Ban-gok lake, Seon-gyojang residence in Gangneung and the hanok complex of the Nampyeong Moon family in Daegu.

== Original soundtrack ==
Moon Lovers: Scarlet Heart Ryeo Original Soundtrack

Soundtrack album by Various artists
- Released: October 25, 2016
- Genres: K-pop, soundtrack
- Languages: Korean, English
- Labels: CJ E&M Music, Nyam Nyam Entertainment

CD 1
No.	Title	Lyrics	Music	Artist(s)	Length
1.	"For You" (너를 위해)	Ji Hoon, Goo Ji-an	Rocoberry	Chen; Baekhyun; Xiumin	3:17
2.	"Say Yes"	Ji Hoon, Loco	Rocoberry	Loco; Punch	3:40
3.	"I Love You, I Remember You" (사랑해 기억해)	Ji Hoon, Goo Ji-an	earattack, Obros	I.O.I	4:08
4.	"Forgetting You" (그대를 잊는다는 건)	Ji Hoon, Goo Ji-an	Rocoberry, Conan, Loco	Davichi	3:13
5.	"All With You"	Ji Hoon, Goo Ji-an	Seo Jae-ha, Kim Young-sung	Taeyeon	3:55
6.	"Can You Hear My Heart" (내 마음 들리나요)	Tablo, Mithra Jin, Ji Hoon, Goo Ji-an	Tablo, DJ Tukutz, Conan, Loco, Rocoberry	Epik High; Lee Hi	4:09
7.	"A Lot Like Love" (사랑인 듯 아닌 듯)	Ji Hoon, Goo Ji-an	Rocoberry, Conan, Loco	Baek A-yeon	3:24
8.	"I Confess" (고백합니다)	Ji Hoon, Goo Ji-an	Hwang Chan-hee, PJ	SG Wannabe	3:41
9.	"Will Be Back" (꼭 돌아오리)	Ji Hoon, Goo Ji-an	Rocoberry, Conan, Loco	Sunhae Im	3:27
10.	"My Love" (내 사랑)	Ji Hoon, Goo Ji-an	Hwang Chan-hee, Lee Seung-joo, Lee Ra-eum	Lee Hi	3:42
11.	"Wind" (바람)	Ji Hoon, Goo Ji-an	Rocoberry, Conan, Loco	Jung Seung-hwan	3:39
12.	"Be With You"	Ji Hoon, Lee Chan-hyuk	Lee Chan-hyuk, Rocoberry	Akdong Musician	3:08
13.	"Goodbye" (안녕)	Ji Hoon, Goo Ji-an	Ahn Young-min	Im Do-hyuk	4:28
Total length:					47:56

CD 2
No.	Title	Music	Artist(s)	Length
1.	"The Prince"	Heo Sang-eun	–	2:03
2.	"Agonal Howl"	Choi Sung-kwon, Son Joo-kwang	–	2:57
3.	"Hae Soo"	Heo Sang-eun, Park Yeong-ik	–	2:07
4.	"Wraith"	Heo Sang-eun, Choi Sung-kwon	–	2:31
5.	"One for Me"	Kim Ji-soo, Choi Sung-kwon	–	2:42
6.	"Wings of Goryeo"	Kim Ji-soo	Park Jin-hee	4:33
7.	"Appassionata"	Bae Bo-ram, Heo Sang-eun	–	2:12
8.	"Vendetta"	Park Young-ik	–	1:54
9.	"Be Your Love"	Kim Ji-soo, Heo Sang-eun	–	2:57
10.	"Gesture of Resistance"	Kim Ji-soo	–	4:41
11.	"Love of Hae Soo"	Park Min-ji, Choi Sung-kwon	–	3:01
12.	"Pastoral Morning"	Heo Sang-eun	–	2:46
13.	"Great Nebula"	Park Joon-soo, Oh Young-sang	–	4:04
14.	"The Sorrow of a Prince"	Park Min-ji, Choi Sung-kwon	–	2:29
15.	"Battle Bobo"	Park Joon-soo, Kim Wi-yeon	–	2:28
Total length:				43:32

=== Charted songs ===
Chart performance

Title	Year	Peak chart positions	Sales	Remarks
Title	Year	KOR Gaon	Sales	Remarks
"For You" (Chen, Baekhyun, Xiumin (EXO))	2016	5	KOR: 597,426	Part 1
"Say Yes" (Loco, Punch)	2016	15	KOR: 274,375	Part 2
"I Love You, I Remember You" (I.O.I)	2016	30	KOR: 124,584	Part 3
"Forgetting You" (Davichi)	2016	8	KOR: 420,017	Part 4
"All With You" (Taeyeon (Girls' Generation))	2016	14	KOR: 145,189	Part 5
"Can You Hear My Heart" (Epik High ft. Lee Hi)	2016	12	KOR: 254,899	Part 6
"A Lot Like Love" (Baek A-yeon)	2016	25	KOR: 131,894	Part 7
"I Confess" (SG Wannabe)	2016	34	KOR: 49,174	Part 8
"Will Be Back" (Sunhae Im)	2016	88	KOR: 23,081	Part 9
"My Love" (Lee Hi)	2016	19	KOR: 151,632	Part 10
"Wind" (Jung Seung-hwan)	2016	49	KOR: 80,613	Part 11
"Be With You" (Akdong Musician)	2016	20	KOR: 146,815	Part 12

Album

Title	Album details	Peak chart position	Sales
Title	Album details	KOR	Sales
Moon Lovers: Scarlet Heart Ryeo OST	Released: October 25, 2016; Label: CJ E&M; Formats: CD, digital download	12	KOR: 9,870; CHN: 4,974,181+

== Release ==
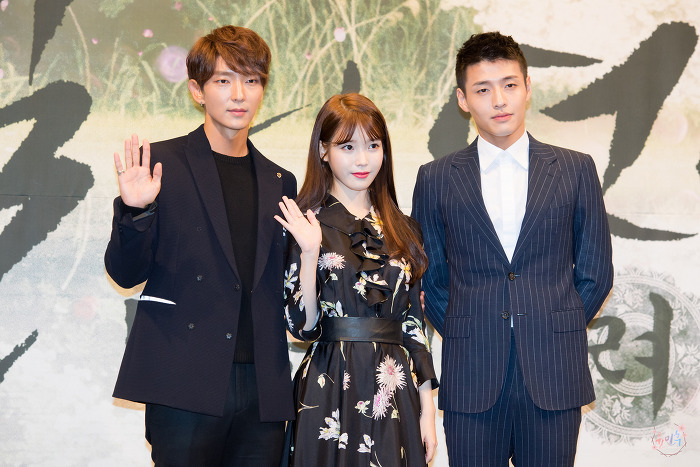
Lee Joon-gi, Lee Ji-eun and Kang Ha-neul at the drama's press conference on August 24, 2016

On August 27, 2016, two days before the airing of the series, South Korean channel SBS aired a one-hour preview containing a historical introduction presented by History professor Seol Min-seok, behind the scenes and interviews with the actors. A second special episode, containing the historical introduction already presented in the August preview and a summary of the first seven episodes, was broadcast on September 14, for the Chuseok.

The 20-episode drama officially started from August 29 on Mondays and Tuesdays, simultaneously in China, Hong Kong, Australia, Cambodia, Malaysia, Singapore, Brunei, and Indonesia, airing the first two episodes back to back, and ended on November 1, 2016. On September 3, SBS aired the first three episodes again in the Director's Cut version following the audience's observations on the soundtrack and the presence of too many characters which were considered a source of distraction.

== Reception ==
=== Critical response ===
After the premiere, audience reviews were mixed, with the adaptation, the soundtrack, the photography, and Lee Joon-gi's acting being praised, while Byun Baek-hyun's performances received criticism. Lee Ji-eun's performance received mixed reviews: some critics believed the actress was doing a good job despite the frequent mood changes from one scene to the other, while others believed that director Kim Kyu-tae's trademark close-ups revealed her lack of emotion.

While for Kim Yoo-jin of TenAsia the drama's brevity compared to the Chinese counterpart and the rapid pace weren't sufficient to introduce each character, for MediaUs the first two episodes established good connections between the characters through rapid development, suggesting however that, if Moon Lovers had focused on the power struggles of the early Goryeo Dynasty "instead of setting up the Goryeo version of Boys Over Flowers," it would have received a positive response from male viewers interested in political dramas. According to Lee Woong of Yonhap News, the first part of the drama, which highlighted the love triangle and had almost all conflicts stemming from Queen Yoo's pathological love for Wang Yo, made the entire series too fragile. There were also doubts about the plausibility of the developments, such as the historical knowledge of the female lead, and that Wang So's scar could be covered with makeup.

With the 10th episode, the mood of the drama changed with the beginning of the power struggle over the throne among the princes, and the development of a three-dimensionality in characters considered "flat and dull" until that moment: Yonhap News again wrote that "IU has shed her comic acting and grasped Hae Soo's emotions in front of a tragic fate. Wang Wook, who has failed to win love and is anxious to choose power for the survival of his family, has become a tragic but empathetic real person." Lee Seung-rok of MyDaily also noted that after turning to tragedy in the second half, the acting, directing and writing had found stability, contributing to the increase in ratings.

The opinions on the finale were discordant: despite the good acting performances of the actors, viewers complained about the excessive product placement in the last episode. On the drama in general, Lee Woong of Yonhap News expressed a positive opinion, writing that Moon Lovers faithfully portrayed the tragedy of a love whose ideals are broken by reality, using fantasy as a dramatic device to show the tragedy of reality and exposing the same contradictions people experience in ordinary life. Park Si-eun's and Woo Hee-jin's acting in their last episodes was also praised for its solidity and maturity.

The reception abroad and on the Internet was more positive than in South Korea. After five episodes, the Beijing Youth Daily wrote that "the Chinese version is calm and steady, while the Korean version is more catering to the new generation of online audiences: the overall style is bright, adding a lot of funny elements. The handling of these details reflects South Korea's serious attitude in remaking foreign work."

=== Audience viewership ===
==== Video-on-demand ====
The series aired simultaneously in China and abroad. On Youku, it reached 300 million views after the first three episodes, more than a billion views after episode 9, and two billions after episode 18. It topped Taiwan's VOD service website KKTV Drama Chart in the September 19–25 week, and was the top content on Hong Kong VOD service's Laiko since the first week of September. On DramaFever, which made it available in North and South America, it recorded more than two million views mid-airing of the series.

==== Terrestrial television ====
According to Nielsen Korea, the first episode recorded a nationwide viewership rating of 7.4%, then taking a downward trend. Ratings started rising in the second half of the series, and reached the highest rating with the last episode, which recorded the 11.3%.

With an average nationwide rating of 7.6% for Nielsen Korea and 7.3% for TNMS, the drama was considered a failure for performing below expectations. The main cause was identified in the decision to film the whole series before airing, which made it impossible to make changes on the way based on feedback. SBS tried to remedy by re-editing the episodes aired domestically starting with the sixth. The fact that the drama wasn't an original story, but a remake, was also indicated as a reason for the disappointing ratings because it created in the potential audience the preconceived idea that the story was heavy and difficult to approach.

For Hankook Ilbo, the audience was tired of bad guys and complicated emotions, preferring instead a kind male lead and a simple story like in Love in the Moonlight, which aired simultaneously on KBS2. The two series were compared throughout the entire broadcast, during which Moon Lovers was overshadowed by the other drama in terms of share, remaining in last place among the dramas broadcast the same evening from the three main television channels, but otherwise recording the highest Content Power Index in the second week of September and October.

With the end of Love in the Moonlight on October 18, viewership rating started increasing steadily and Moon Lovers was the most watched drama on the evening of October 24.

Ep.	Original broadcast date	Average audience share			
Ep.	Original broadcast date	AGB Nielsen		TNmS	
Ep.	Original broadcast date	Nationwide	Seoul	Nationwide	Seoul
Special I	August 27, 2016	3.6% (NR)	4.0% (NR)	3.7% (NR)	4.2% (NR)
1	August 29, 2016	7.4% (18th)	8.0% (18th)	7.9% (NR)	9.1% (13th)
2	August 29, 2016	9.3% (12th)	10.4% (11th)	8.9% (18th)	10.0% (10th)
3	August 30, 2016	7.0% (19th)	8.0% (15th)	7.1% (18th)	7.8% (19th)
4	September 5, 2016	5.7% (NR)	6.3% (NR)	6.1% (NR)	6.7% (NR)
5	September 6, 2016	6.0% (NR)	7.3% (18th)	6.2% (NR)	6.8% (NR)
6	September 12, 2016	5.7% (NR)	6.8% (NR)	5.1% (NR)	7.7% (NR)
7	September 13, 2016	5.8% (NR)	6.6% (NR)	5.2% (NR)	6.4% (NR)
Special II	September 14, 2016	3.4% (NR)	(NR)	(NR)	(NR)
8	September 19, 2016	6.9% (NR)	8.6% (13th)	5.3% (NR)	5.8% (NR)
9	September 20, 2016	6.2% (NR)	7.9% (15th)	6.1% (NR)	6.4% (NR)
10	September 26, 2016	7.1% (NR)	8.2% (16th)	6.4% (NR)	7.4% (19th)
11	September 27, 2016	7.5% (19th)	8.5% (15th)	6.5% (20th)	6.7% (19th)
12	October 3, 2016	7.9% (20th)	8.8% (15th)	6.8% (NR)	7.1% (NR)
13	October 4, 2016	8.2% (18th)	9.3% (9th)	7.3% (18th)	7.5% (15th)
14	October 10, 2016	6.8% (NR)	7.5% (19th)	6.5% (NR)	7.2% (NR)
15	October 11, 2016	8.2% (13th)	9.2% (9th)	8.7% (15th)	9.2% (10th)
16	October 18, 2016 (Note: Episode 16 didn't air as scheduled (Monday, October 17) due to the broadcast of a baseball game.)	5.9% (NR)	6.8% (19th)	5.8% (NR)	6.2% (NR)
17	October 24, 2016	9.8% (8th)	10.6% (6th)	9.9% (11th)	10.6% (6th)
18	October 25, 2016	10.1% (8th)	11.2% (5th)	10.7% (7th)	10.6% (7th)
19	October 31, 2016	9.0% (9th)	9.8% (7th)	9.0% (15th)	10.1% (6th)
20	November 1, 2016	11.3% (5th)	12.2% (4th)	10.8% (5th)	11.8% (5th)
Average		7.6%	8.6%	7.3%	8.1%
In this table, the blue numbers represent the lowest ratings and the red numbers represent the highest ratings.; NR denotes that the drama did not rank in the top 20 daily programs on that date.

=== Impact ===
Moon Lovers: Scarlet Heart Ryeo was chosen as the most anticipated series of the second half of 2016 in China. The previews released through Naver TV cast reached more than one million views each in early October. In Singapore it was number three in 2016 Google Trends (TV shows section). According to the research institute Good Data Corporation, the series was the third most discussed drama of 2016, after KBS dramas Descendants of the Sun and Love in the Moonlight.

In an American survey conducted on Korean content consumers in October 2016, Moon Lovers: Scarlet Heart Ryeo and Lee Joon-gi placed second in the drama and favorite actors charts respectively, while Lee Ji-eun placed third in the favorite actresses chart. Due to Moon Lovers, Lee Joon-gi's popularity grew and the actor's name consistently topped the real-time and weekly portal sites search rankings. In episode 8, his performance in the last scene drew viewers' attention, and his name, the drama title and "Gwangjong" were the most searched words.

=== Accolades ===
On October 28, 2016 Moon Lovers received the K-Culture Pride Award at Korea Brand Awards "for the contribution to the exchange of cultural contents" between Korea and China, and at the end of the year, it was nominated for twelve categories at SBS Drama Awards, winning seven in total.

Year	Award	Category	Recipient	Result	Ref.
2016	Korea Brand Awards	K-Culture Pride	Moon Lovers: Scarlet Heart Ryeo	Won	
2016	SBS Drama Awards	Top Excellence Award, Actor in a Genre & Fantasy Drama	Lee Joon-gi	Nominated	
2016	SBS Drama Awards	Excellence Award, Actor in a Fantasy Drama	Kang Ha-neul	Won	
2016	SBS Drama Awards	Excellence Award, Actor in a Fantasy Drama	Hong Jong-hyun	Nominated	
2016	SBS Drama Awards	Excellence Award, Actress in a Fantasy Drama	Kang Han-na	Nominated	
2016	SBS Drama Awards	Special Acting Award, Actor in a Fantasy Drama	Kim Sung-kyun	Nominated	
2016	SBS Drama Awards	Special Acting Award, Actress in a Fantasy Drama	Seohyun	Won	
2016	SBS Drama Awards	Hallyu Star Award	Lee Joon-gi	Won	
2016	SBS Drama Awards	Hallyu Star Award	Lee Ji-eun	Nominated	
2016	SBS Drama Awards	Best Couple Award	Lee Joon-gi and Lee Ji-eun	Won	
2016	SBS Drama Awards	Top 10 Stars Award	Lee Joon-gi	Won	
2016	SBS Drama Awards	New Star Award	Byun Baek-hyun	Won	
2016	SBS Drama Awards	Idol Academy Award, Best "Drudge"	Lee Ji-eun	Won	
2016	1st Asia Artist Awards	Best Star Award, Actor	Kang Ha-neul	Nominated	
2016	1st Asia Artist Awards	Popularity Award	Byun Baek-hyun	Won	
2016	1st Asia Artist Awards	Best Rookie Award	Byun Baek-hyun	Nominated	
2016	1st Asia Artist Awards	Best Rookie Award	Nam Joo-hyuk	Nominated	
2016	1st Asia Artist Awards	Best Rookie Award	Ji Soo	Nominated	
2017	53rd Baeksang Arts Awards	Best New Actress	Kang Han-na	Nominated	
2017	5th DramaFever Awards	Best Ensemble	Moon Lovers: Scarlet Heart Ryeo	Won	
2017	5th DramaFever Awards	Best Historical Drama	Moon Lovers: Scarlet Heart Ryeo	Won	

== See also ==
- Scarlet Heart
