= Scarlet Heart =

Chinese television series

- Promotional poster
- Genre: Romance; Historical fiction Chuanyue
- Based on: Bu Bu Jing Xin by Tong Hua
- Directed by: Lee Kwok-lap
- Starring: Cecilia Liu; Nicky Wu; Kevin Cheng; Yuan Hong; Lin Gengxin
- Opening theme: One Persistent Thought by Hu Ge and Alan
- Ending theme: Three Inches of Heaven by Ivy Yan; Season of Waiting by Cecilia Liu
- Composer: Raymond Wong
- Country of origin: China
- Original language: Mandarin
- No. of episodes: 35

Production
- Producer: Karen Tsoi
- Production location: China
- Running time: 45 mins
- Production company: Tangren Media

Original release
- Network: Hunan Satellite TV
- Release: 13 January – 28 September 2011

Related
- Scarlet Heart 2 Moon Lovers: Scarlet Heart Ryeo; Scarlet Heart Ullavee

Scarlet Heart
- Scarlet Heart's intertitle (Simplified Chinese version)
- Simplified Chinese: 步步惊心
- Traditional Chinese: 步步驚心
- Hanyu Pinyin: Bùbù Jīngxīn
Transcriptions
Standard Mandarin
- Hanyu Pinyin: Bùbù Jīngxīn

Scarlet Heart (Chinese: 步步惊心, lit. Startling by Each Step) is a 2011 Chinese television series based on the novel Bu Bu Jing Xin by Tong Hua. It premiered in China on Hunan Broadcasting System (HBS) on 10 September 2011.

The series tells the story of a woman, Zhang Xiao, who time-travels from the 21st century to the Qing Dynasty during the Kangxi Emperor's reign, where she, as her previous incarnate Ma'er'tai Ruoxi, encounters the emperor's nine sons, who are involved in a lengthy battle for the throne. During the course of the series, she has relationships with the Eighth Prince and then the Fourth Prince, the latter eventually ascends the throne as the Yongzheng Emperor. Although largely faithful to the novel, the series’ ending differs from the original.

Scarlet Heart was a commercial and critical success across Asia, establishing Cecilia Liu as a lead actress and revitalizing Nicky Wu’s career. A sequel, Scarlet Heart 2, aired in China on Zhejiang TV on 22 April 2014. A film version, Time to Love, with different cast, was released in 2015. A Korean version, Moon Lovers: Scarlet Heart Ryeo, aired in 2016. A Thai version, Scarlet Heart Thailand, was announced in 2024.

== Synopsis ==
Zhang Xiao (Cecilia Liu), a young woman from the 21st century, suffers a near-fatal accident that sends her back in time to the Qing Dynasty during the Kangxi Emperor's (Damian Lau) reign. She finds herself trapped in the body of one of her previous incarnations: Ma'ertai Ruoxi, the teenage daughter of a Manchu general. In this new timeline, she has an elder sister, Ruolan (Annie Liu), who is a concubine of the Kangxi Emperor's eighth son, Yinsi (Kevin Cheng). Ruoxi initially tries to return to the future, but she soon adjusts to life in this era. She gets acquainted with Kangxi's other sons, including the fourth prince Yinzhen (Nicky Wu), tenth prince Yin'e (Ye Zuxin), and fourteenth prince Yinti (Lin Gengxin). She also forges a close friendship with the thirteenth prince, Yinxiang (Yuan Hong).

Ruoxi attracts the attention of the emperor with rumors of her brashness and bravery, and manages to charm him with her intelligence and wit. Later, at the imperial palace's "beauty draft" (during which concubines and wives are chosen for the princes or the emperor himself), conflicting arrangements are made by Yinsi and his wife, Gogoro Minghui (Shi Xiaoqun), leading to Ruoxi being drafted into the service of the dowager empress to keep the peace, before Ruoxi is given an appointment as a servant to the emperor, specifically to prepare and serve tea to him and those he hosts.

During Ruoxi's stay in Yinsi's house, Yinsi falls in love with her. She initially rejects him but then returns his feelings, and agrees to marry him if he gives up competing for the succession to the throne. This is because Ruoxi is aware of the history, in which Yinsi's ambition will ultimately lead to his death in prison after Yinzhen becomes emperor. However, Yinsi refuses to and thus Ruoxi breaks up with him. Before leaving, Ruoxi warns Yinsi of Yinzhen's plans to usurp the throne and came up with solutions for him to prevent being taken down by Yinzhen.

Ruoxi then starts to get closer to Yinzhen, and their interactions changes her unfavorable opinion of him, and they gradually fall for each other. Meanwhile, Yinsi and his supporters, acting on Ruoxi's advice, frame Yinzhen for plotting against the crown prince Yinreng (Zhang Lei). Yinxiang, the closest brother to Yinzhen, steps forward to take responsibility and is sentenced to house arrest. After this incident, Yinsi realizes that Ruoxi is now romantically involved with Yinzhen. Yinreng is deposed after his criminal ways are exposed and is imprisoned for life. Kangxi then begins showing preference for Yinti and offers Ruoxi as a concubine to him. However, Ruoxi boldly defies the emperor's order, and as a penalty, she is demoted to the laundry department.

Ruoxi works within the laundry department for a number of years, and is offered some level of protection and special treatment by ways of the princes. Kangxi falls ill during this time, and when Ruoxi is brought back to the emperor's service by Eunuch Wang to prepare pastries and help stimulate Kangxi's appetite, he pardons her and restores her to her former role as his lead tea server.

After Kangxi dies, with military support from Longkodo (Zhao Jialin) and Nian Gengyao (Xing Hanqing), Yinzhen falsely claims that Kangxi named him the successor, effectively staging a coup and taking the throne from Yinti to become the Yongzheng Emperor. He releases Yinxiang, who is enfeebled by years of custody.

Yinzhen moves Ruoxi into his quarters, namely as his lady-in-waiting, and consummates their relationship. He does not, however, marry her, as he wants to be able to live with her and see her every day—concubines have their own estates in the harem between which the emperor must divide his time. Ruoxi is pleased enough with this arrangement, as she has always been reticent about marriage and enjoys seeing Yinzhen daily as well, until her happiness is overshadowed by Yinzhen’s paranoia and his ruthless persecution of his brothers. She frequently finds herself caught between the rival camps of Yinzhen and Yinsi.

When Gorolo Minghui, Yinsi’s wife, tells Ruoxi that Yinsi began opposing Yinzhen years earlier because he was provoked by Ruoxi’s conviction that he would lose to Yinzhen, Ruoxi is devastated. Although Yinsi never learns that Ruoxi’s warning stemmed not from a lack of faith in him but from her knowledge of the future, she is overwhelmed by the cruel irony of history and her own role in the princes’ fratricidal struggle. The shock causes her to miscarry Yinzhen’s child, leaving her unable to conceive again. Enraged, Yinzhen blames Yinsi and Minghui, issuing an edict forcing them to divorce, which drives Minghui to commit suicide.

Wracked by guilt and fearful of Yinzhen’s harsh treatment of his brothers, Ruoxi confesses her role in driving Yinsi into opposition against Yinzhen. Shocked by the revelation, Yinzhen begins treating her coldly. Unable to bear the emotional strain, Ruoxi asks Yinti to help her leave the palace. Yinti presents Yinzhen with an edict issued by the late Kangxi Emperor, which betrothes Ruoxi to Yinti in recognition of his military achievements. When Yinzhen remains reluctant to carry out the late emperor's edict, Yinsi intervenes and reveals his past romance with Ruoxi. The disclosure proves to be the final blow for Yinzhen, who feels deeply betrayed by Ruoxi and ultimately let her leave the Forbidden City to marry Yinti.

Despite Yinti's excellent care, Ruoxi's emotional anguish deeply affects her health, and she begs him to send a letter to Yinzhen, requesting to see the emperor one last time before she dies. However, a misunderstanding between Yinzhen and Yinti causes the letter, sent in Yinti's name, to be thrown aside unread. Ruoxi struggles to stay alive, but after three days, she concludes that Yinzhen's absence confirms that his love for her has ended, and she dies. When news of Ruoxi's death reaches Yinzhen, he rushes to Yinti's house, regretting his actions after learning that Ruoxi still loved him.

Yinzhen subjects Yinsi and Yintang (Han Dong) to increasingly harsh punishments and imprisoned both men. Yinxiang visits them in prison and delivers poison, which is Ruoxi’s last request for him before her departure from the palace. The two princes subsequently take their own lives, ending their suffering as Ruoxi wished. Yinxiang dies a few years later, followed shortly by Yinzhen himself, whose 12-year reign as Emperor was the shortest in Qing history. Yinti lives on but does not find another wife. Only Yin'e, who once had a crush on Ruoxi, has a happy ending with his wife (Liu Yuxin), whom he grows to love.

Upon Ruoxi’s death, Zhang Xiao awakens in a hospital in 2011 and learns that she has been in a coma for several weeks. She is left wondering whether her experiences in the past were real or merely a dream. After recovering, Zhang researches the Qing dynasty and discovers that history remains on its proper course, with no trace of Ma’ertai Ruoxi in the historical record. However, during a visit to a museum, she notices a woman in a Kangxi-era painting depicting the emperor and the nine princes enjoying a tea gathering before the deadly succession struggle. The scene exactly matches her memories of life in the palace. Meanwhile, another visitor bearing a striking resemblance to Yinzhen passes by but fails to recognize her. The series ends on a cliffhanger as the man walks away, leaving Zhang Xiao in tears.

== Cast ==
=== Main ===
- Cecilia Liu as Maer'tai Ruoxi (馬爾泰·若曦) / Zhang Xiao (張曉)

A modern day 9-to-5 white-collar worker, who accidentally goes back in time from the 21st century to the Qing Dynasty as the teenage daughter of a Manchu general. Smart and plucky, she crosses paths with nine princes while trying to use her knowledge of history to navigate the ever treacherous palace games.

- Nicky Wu as Yinzhen (胤禛)

The aloof and reserved fourth prince, known for his perceptive thinking and cruelty. In order to protect the people around him and driven by his mother's favouritism toward his brother, Yinti, Yinzhen decides to fight for the throne. He becomes interested in Ruoxi when he notices her avoiding him, before falling for her.

- Kevin Cheng as Yinsi (胤禩)

The gentle and virtuous eighth prince, considered a favorite to the throne and the archrival of Yinzhen. Having been born to a lowly palace maid, Yinsi seeks power to win the respect of his brothers and ministers. He falls in love with Ruoxi, but gives up on her when asked to choose between the throne and love.

- Yuan Hong as Yinxiang (胤祥)

The rebellious, free-spirited thirteenth prince, who shows no interest in power as his brothers do. His nonconformist nature lends him to relate to Ruoxi's 21st century mindset, and they become best friends.

- Lin Gengxin as Yinti (允禵)

The forthright and sincere fourteenth prince, who is loyal to his brothers and to Ruoxi, but estranged from his full brother, Yinzhen. To save Ruoxi from the palace, he eventually marries her.

=== Supporting ===
==== Emperor and Other Princes ====
- Damian Lau as the Kangxi Emperor (康熙)
- Zhang Lei as Yinreng (胤礽), the crown prince
- Yang Xiaobo as Yinti (胤禔), the First Prince, he was jailed for life as he was found out by the Emperor that he's a culprit for cursing Yinreng to being deposed.
- Chen Jingyu as Yinzhi (胤祉), the Third Prince, he spread rumours accusing the First Prince of using sorcery to overthrow Yinreng from his Crown Prince position, causing him to lose favour with the Emperor.
- Wang Xiaodong as Yinqi (胤祺), the Fifth Prince
- Han Dong as Yintang (胤禟), the Ninth Prince who is calculating and brusque. He is aligned with Yinsi and thinks of ways to help him plot against Yinzhen.
- Ye Zuxin as Yin'e (胤礻我), the Tenth Prince who is cheerful and bumbling. He has an unrequited crush on Ruoxi, but the two later becomes close friends.
- Qu Aohui as Hongshi (弘时), the third son of Yinzhen who stands against his father.

==== Royal ladies ====
- Dai Chunrong as Consort De (德妃), Yinzhen and Yinti's mother
- Liu Jie as Consort Liang (良妃), Yinsi's mother
- Mu Tingting as Lady Ula Nara (乌喇那拉氏), Yinzhen's first wife
- Lu Meifang as Consort Nian (年妃), Yinzhen's second wife and Nian Gengyao's sister
- Shi Xiaoqun as Gororo Minghui (郭络罗·明慧), Yinsi's wife
- Annie Liu as Ma'ertai Ruolan (马尔泰·若兰), Yinsi's second wife and Ruoxi's sister. She is unwillingly married to Yinsi, who loves her and thus led to her father killing her lover in a bid to get her married to Yinsi.
- Liu Yuxin as Gororo Mingyu (郭络罗·明玉), Yin'e's wife
- Li Linlin as Lady Fuca (富察氏), Yinxiang's wife
- Chai Wei as Princess Chenghuan (承欢), Yinxiang and Lüwu's daughter

==== Ministers and servants ====
- Xing Hanqing as Nian Gengyao (年羹尧), a trusted minister of Yinzhen and Consort Nian's brother
- Zhao Jialin as Longkodo (隆科多), a trusted minister of Yinzhen
- Gao Sen as Li Guangdi (李光地), a trusted minister of the Kangxi Emperor
- Ye Qing as Yu Tan (玉檀), a tea servant under Ruoxi who is the ninth prince's spy
- Deng Limin as Li Dequan (李德全), head of the internal department who serves the Kangxi Emperor
- Zhou Yancheng as Wang Xi (王喜), Li Dequan's disciple
- Cao Xinye as Qiao Hui (巧慧), Ruolan and Ruoxi's maid
- Qi Qinglin as Li Fu (李福), a eunuch who serves Yinsi
- Hu Zhonghu as Gao Wuyong (高无庸), a eunuch who serves Yinzhen and later becomes the new head of internal department
- Shen Baoping as Zhang Qianying (张千英), the head of the washing department
- Lian Teyue as Imperial Physician He (何太医)
- Kang Mingtong as Yun Xiang (芸香)
- Huo Dongdong as Yan Ping (艳萍)
- Zao Yang as Xiao Shunzi (小顺子)
- Ji Xue as Mei Xiang (梅香)
- Guo Jinying as Ju Yun (菊韵)

==== Mongolians ====
- Guo Xiaoting as Princess Suwan Guwalgiya-Minmin (苏完瓜尔佳·敏敏), a Mongolian princess who falls in love with Yinxiang
- Ba Sen as Prince Suwan-Guwalgiya (苏完瓜尔佳王爷)
- Zheng Kai as Prince Irgen Gioro Zuoying (伊尔根觉罗·佐鹰)

==== Others ====
- Guo Zhenni as Lüwu (绿芜), a courtesan and the love interest and confidante of Yinxiang. She ultimately kills herself when she realizes that her lowly birth will hinder Yinxiang's future endeavors.
- Wang Xiaodong as Chang Qingshan (常青山), Ruolan's lover who was killed by her father.
- Ma Tianyu as Huang Di (黄棣), Zhang Xiao's present-day boyfriend.

== Deviations from the novel ==
The show's producers have announced that the series will remain mostly faithful to Bu Bu Jing Xin, the novel by Tong Hua on which it is based. However, there are some differences:

- In the novel's beginning, though in the television series Zhang Xiao remains a 25-year-old white-collar worker — her alter ego, Ma'ertai Ruoxi, was 13 years old, not 16. Another difference was that Zhang came from the year 2005, not 2011.
- In the novel, Ruoxi is unable to return to her own time and ultimately succumbs to her illness, while Yinzhen dies ten years later amid hopes of reuniting with Ruoxi after death. The story ends with Yinzhen's son Hongli's (whom he fathered with Lady Niohuru) ascension to the throne as the Qianlong Emperor. In the television series, after Ruoxi and Yinzhen's deaths, Ruoxi's soul returns to her incarnation in the 21st century. Whilst struggling to get over the trauma of her experiences of time travel, she encounters a man who resembles Yinzhen and is possibly a present-day incarnation of him. The man does not recognize her, though he did inquire her if they knew each other before making his leave. Zhang Xiao remains in guilt over everything that happened when she was Ma'ertai Ruoxi. She chooses not say anything and tearfully watches the man leave.

== Soundtrack ==
Scarlet Heart- Original Soundtrack (步步惊心电视剧原声音乐大碟)

Soundtrack album (Audio CD/Digital download) by Raymond Wong Hu Ge Alan Dawa Dolma Cecilia Liu Ivy Yan
- Released: October 2011
- Length: 46:50
- Label: Chinese Entertainment Shanghai

Scarlet Heart - Original Soundtrack (步步惊心电视剧原声音乐大碟)
No.	Title	Music	Length
1.	"Yinian Zhizhuo (一念执着; One Persistent Thought)"	performed by Hu Ge and Alan Dawa Dolma	04:26
2.	"Dengni De Jijie (等你的季节; Season of Waiting)"	performed by Cecilia Liu	04:05
3.	"Sancun Tiantang (三寸天堂; Three Inches of Heaven)"	performed by Ivy Yan	04:50
4.	"Bubu Jingxin (步步惊心; Startling by Each Step)"	composed by Raymond Wong	02:03
5.	"Qi Meng (奇梦; Strange Dream)"	composed by Raymond Wong	01:56
6.	"Bie Kongju (别恐惧; Do Not Fear)"	composed by Raymond Wong	02:08
7.	"Bao Lei (堡垒; The Castle)"	composed by Raymond Wong	02:39
8.	"Du (毒; Poison)"	composed by Raymond Wong	01:01
9.	"Mosheng (陌生; Unfamiliarity)"	composed by Raymond Wong	02:29
10.	"Yu (郁; Depression)"	composed by Raymond Wong	02:03
11.	"Huangshi Lailin (皇室来临; The Arrival of the Imperial Family)"	composed by Raymond Wong	00:29
12.	"Gongfu (功夫; Kung Fu)"	composed by Raymond Wong	00:47
13.	"Qingmu (倾慕; L'Amour)"	composed by Raymond Wong	02:28
14.	"Huanxin (欢欣; Delight)"	composed by Raymond Wong	01:39
15.	"Qihuan (奇幻; Fantasy)"	composed by Raymond Wong	00:40
16.	"Xiao Keai (小可爱; Adorable)"	composed by Raymond Wong	01:42
17.	"Qing Du (情毒; Love Poison)"	composed by Raymond Wong	01:38
18.	"Bu Yaozou (不要走; Do Not Leave)"	composed by Raymond Wong	03:48
19.	"Bei (悲; Sorrow)"	composed by Raymond Wong	03:27
20.	"Zhuijing (追惊; Aftershock)"	composed by Raymond Wong	02:23
Total length:			46:50

Songs not included in the commercial release

- Aide Lianyi (爱的涟漪; Love's Ripples) performed by Ailiya & Alicia [04:30]
- Diaoke Aiqing (雕刻爱情; Sculpture of Love) performed by Zheng Jiajia [03:35]
- Xuehua Hongmei (雪花红梅; Snowflakes and Red Plum Blossoms) performed by Gong Shujun [04:14]

== Awards ==
Year	Award	Category	Recipient	Ref.
2011	3rd China TV Drama Awards	Most Popular Television Series	Scarlet Heart	
2012	18th Shanghai Television Festival	Most Popular Actor	Nicky Wu	
2012	18th Shanghai Television Festival	Most Popular Actress	Cecilia Liu	
2012	7th Seoul International Drama Awards	Most Popular Overseas Drama	Scarlet Heart	
2012	7th Seoul International Drama Awards	Asia Popularity Award	Nicky Wu	
2012	8th Huading Awards	Best Actor (Ancient)	Nicky Wu	
2012	8th Huading Awards	Media Popularity Award	Nicky Wu	
2012	8th Huading Awards	Media Popularity Award	Cecilia Liu	

== Remake ==
Moon Lovers: Scarlet Heart Ryeo is a South Korean remake, directed by Kim Kyu-tae. It is the first Korean drama project for Universal Studios and has a budget of $13 million. It began airing on 29 August 2016 for 20 episodes. It received criticisms for its screenplay, direction and performances, but was well received overseas. In China, the series aired at the same time as its Korean broadcast on Youku and Mango TV, also, in Hong Kong on LeTV, and on ONE TV ASIA in Malaysia, Singapore and Indonesia under the title Scarlet Heart. Due to its simultaneous broadcast and extensive publicity campaign, including a fan-meeting with Kang Ha-neul before the premiere, the drama was well received in Singapore and Malaysia, and has 2.5 billion cumulative views on China's biggest video platform, Youku.

== See also ==
- Palace
