= Bu Bu Jing Xin =

2005 novel by Tong Hua

Bubu Jingxin
- Covers of all three volumes of the 2012 Taiwanese edition published by Yeren Culture Publishing (野人文化出版社)
- Author: Tong Hua
- Original title: 步步驚心
- Language: Chinese
- Subject: Time travel, Imperial China
- Genre: Romance, historical fiction, chuanyue
- Publisher: Jinjiang Original Network (晉江原創網); Ocean Press (海洋出版社); National Press (民族出版社); Huashan Arts Press (花山文藝出版社); Hunan Literature and Art Publishing House (湖南文藝出版社); Yeren Culture Publishing (野人文化出版社)
- Publication date: 2005
- Publication place: China
- ISBN: 978-7540450977

Bubu Jingxin
- Simplified Chinese: 步步惊心
- Traditional Chinese: 步步驚心
- Literal meaning: Startling by Each Step
Transcriptions
Standard Mandarin
- Hanyu Pinyin: Bùbù Jīngxīn

Bubu Jingxin (Chinese: 步步驚心), also known as Startling by Each Step or Scarlet Heart, is Tong Hua's debut novel. Originally serialized online in 2005 on Jinjiang Original Network (晉江原創網), it was published in multiple editions by Ocean Press (海洋出版社), National Press (民族出版社), Huashan Arts Press (花山文藝出版社), Hunan Literature and Art Publishing House (湖南文藝出版社), and Yeren Culture Publishing (野人文化出版社). Tong Hua revised the novel in 2009 and 2011. The latest edition contains an additional 30,000 word epilogue.

The story features a twenty-first century woman who gets transported back in time to the late Kangxi reign of the Qing dynasty, where she becomes caught up in the succession struggle among the emperor’s nine sons. The novel was most prominently adapted into the Chinese television series Scarlet Heart, and was later also adapted into a radio drama, feature, film, stage play, a Korean and a Thai drama.

== Synopsis ==
Twenty-first century woman, Zhang Xiao, encountered traffic collision after work that sent her back in time to the Qing Dynasty during the Kangxi Emperor's reign (in the year 1704). She found herself trapped in the body of a young daughter of a Manchu aristocrat, Ma'ertai Ruoxi, younger sister of Ma'ertai Ruolan, who was a concubine of the emperor's eighth son, Yinsi. Stranded in the past, Ruoxi became acquainted with Kangxi's other sons, including the fourth prince Yinzhen and his full brother, the fourteenth prince Yinti. She forged a close friendship with the thirteenth prince, Yinxiang. Using charm and wit, Ruoxi won the emperor's favor and became his lady-in-waiting, attending to the monarch and his family.

During Ruoxi's stay in the Forbidden City, she and Yinsi developed a mutual attraction. She initially rejected him but later agreed to marry him if he gave up his ambition for the throne. Ruoxi knew that Yinsi's path will ultimately lead to his lifelong imprisonment after Yinzhen became emperor. Yinsi refused and Ruoxi warned him to be wary of Yinzhen, providing him a list of those who would support his ascension.

After breaking up with Yinsi, Ruoxi fell in love with Yinzhen. Meanwhile, Yinsi and his supporters, acting on Ruoxi's advice, framed Yinzhen for plotting against the crown prince Yinreng. Yinxiang took the blame and was sentenced to house arrest. After this incident, Yinsi discovered that Ruoxi was romantically involved with Yinzhen. The battle for the throne became inflamed when Yinreng's other crimes later came to light. The crown prince lost both his position and freedom. Kangxi then began to show preference for Yinti and offered Ruoxi as a concubine to him. Ruoxi, however, declined. Outraged by her boldness, the emperor demoted her to the laundry department.

Kangxi eventually died of illness. With military support from Longkodo and Nian Gengyao; Yinzhen staged a coup and seized the throne from Yinti to become the Yongzheng Emperor. Yinzhen then released Yinxiang from custody and began a romantic relationship with Ruoxi. In an attempt to keep the secret that Yinti was named heir before their father's death, Yinzhen placed him under house arrest. Ruoxi is often caught between the rival factions.

The ninth son, Yintang, manipulated Yinsi's wife Gororo Minghui into telling Ruoxi that Yinsi acted against Yinzhen years earlier. Ruoxi was shocked by this revelation, and in addition, remembering Yinzhen told her once that he initially had no desire to become an emperor, she realizes her actions inadvertently shaped events (see predestination paradox). Her despair brought on a miscarriage and she descended into illness. Enraged, Yinzhen blamed Yinsi and his wife, issuing an edict forcing them to divorce, which led the latter to commit suicide. Remorseful of the consequences, Ruoxi confessed the truth to Yinzhen and Yinxiang, leading Yinzhen to treat her coldly. Ruoxi is unable to withstand the mental stress and asked Yinti to help her leave the palace. Yinsi knew that Yinzhen would not allow Ruoxi to leave and decided to intervene. He disclosed details of his past romance and an angered Yinzhen allowed Ruoxi to leave.

Ruoxi's emotional anguish affected her health. She begged Yinti to send a letter to Yinzhen, requesting to see the emperor one last time before she dies. However, a misunderstanding caused the letter to be thrown aside unread. After three days, Ruoxi concluded that Yinzhen's absence confirmed that his love for her has faded, and she died (in the year 1725 at the age 35). When news of Ruoxi's death reached Yinzhen, he rushed to Yinti's house, regretting his actions after learning that Ruoxi still loved him.

Blaming Yinsi and Yintang for Ruoxi's death, Yinzhen charged his half-brothers for ambiguous offenses and banished them from the imperial household. Both would eventually die in 1726, as Ruoxi predicted.

History remained unchanged.

== Adaptations ==
- In 2011, Chinese Entertainment Shanghai Ltd. adapted the novel into the television series Scarlet Heart, starring Cecilia Liu, Nicky Wu, Kevin Cheng, Lin Gengxin and Yuan Hong. A sequel began filming in March 2013. Multimedia produced this drama complete with English subtitles.
- In 2011, following the success of the television series, Feiran Zhuosheng Radio Drama Associations (斐然卓聲廣播劇社團) adapted the novel into the radio drama Bubu Jingxin, starring Tang Tang as Ma'ertai Ruoxi.
- In 2012, Shanghai Dramatic Arts Centre, Beijing All Entertainment Co., Ltd. and Culture of China Media Group adapted the novel for the stage Bubu Jingxin, starring Michelle Gong as Ma'ertai Ruoxi/Zhang Xiao.
- In 2015, the novel was adapted into the feature film Time to Love starring Ivy Chen, Tony Yang and Shawn Dou.
- In 2016, South Korea produced its own version of the story, Moon Lovers: Scarlet Heart Ryeo, set in Goryeo and starring IU, Lee Joon-gi and Kang Ha-neul.
- In 2024, the novel was adapted into a Thai drama titled Scarlet Heart Thailand by GMMTV, starring Tu Tontawan and Metawin Opas-iamkajorn.
