= List of Goryeo people =

This is a list of notable people from the Goryeo dynasty, a period in Korean history lasting from 918 to 1392.

== Rulers ==
For a chronological list of rulers, see List of Korean monarchs

1. King Taejo (918–943)
2. King Hyejong (943–945)
3. King Jeongjong (945–949)
4. King Gwangjong (949–975)
5. King Gyeongjong (975–981)
6. King Seongjong (981–997)
7. King Mokjong (997–1009)
8. King Hyeonjong (1009–1031)
9. King Deokjong (1031–1034)
10. King Jeongjong (1034–1046)
11. King Munjong (1046–1083)
12. King Sunjong (1083)
13. King Seonjong (1083–1094)
14. King Heonjong (1094–1095)
15. King Sukjong (1095–1105)
16. King Yejong (1105–1122)
17. King Injong (1122–1146)
18. King Uijong (1146–1170)
19. King Myeongjong (1170–1197)
20. King Sinjong (1197–1204)
21. King Huijong (1204–1211)
22. King Gangjong (1211–1213)
23. King Gojong (1213–1259)
24. King Wonjong (1259–1274)
25. King Chungnyeol (1274–1308)
26. King Chungseon (1308–1313)
27. King Chungsuk (1313–1330; 1332–1339)
28. King Chunghye (1330–1332; 1339–1344)
29. King Chungmok (1344–1348)
30. King Chungjeong (1348–1351)
31. King Gongmin (1351–1374)
32. King U (1374–1388)
33. King Chang (1388–1389)
34. King Gongyang (1389–1392)

== Military officials ==
- Sin Sung-gyŏm, who died saving the life of Taejo.
- Sŏ Hŭi
- Kang Cho
- Yi Hyŏn-un, Kang Cho's deputy, defected to the Liao
- Kang Kam-ch'an, remembered for his victories in the Third Goryeo-Khitan War.
- Yun Kwan
- Chŏng Chung-bu
- Yi Ŭi-bang
- Kyŏng Tae-sŭng
- Yi Ŭi-min
- Ch'oe Ch'ung-hŏn, military dictator.
- Ch'oe U, military dictator. Ch'oe Ch'ung-hŏn's son.
- Pae Chung-son
- Kim T'ong-jŏng
- Ch'oe Mu-sŏn, scientist and military commander.
- Ch'oe Yŏng, rival to Yi Sŏng-gye in the waning days of Goryeo.
- Yi Cha-ch'un, father of Yi Sŏng-gye.
- Yi Sŏng-gye, who overthrew Goryeo in the late 14th century and established the Joseon Dynasty.

== Scholar-officials ==
- Yi Cha-gyŏm
- Kim Sŏn
- Ch'oe Sung-no
- Ch'oe Ch'ung
- Hyŏngnyŏn Chŏng, author of the Kyunyŏ-jŏn
- Kim Pu-sik
- Ch'oe Yun-ŭi
- Ch'oe Uch'ŏng
- An Hyang
- Chŏng Mong-ju
- Yi Saek
- Kil Chae
- Chŏng To-jŏn
- Kwŏn Kŭn
- U T'ak

== Buddhist monks ==
- Doseon
- Daegak Guksa
- Myo Cheong
- Jinul
- Il-yeon
- Sin Ton
- Muhak

== Popular leaders ==
- Manjeok

== Collaborators of Yuan ==
- Wang Ko
- Wang Toghtua Bukha
- Empress Gi
- Hong Pok-wŏn, a Goryeo commander who later served as an administrator of the Mongol Empire.
- Ki Ch'ŏl

== See also ==
- List of Baekje people
- List of Silla people
- List of Goguryeo people
- List of Joseon Dynasty people
- History of Korea
