= Chungju Yoo clan =

Korean clan from North Chungcheong Province

Chungju Yoo clan Chungju Yu clan
- Parent family: Yoo clan
- Country: Korea
- Origin: Chungju City, North Chungcheong Province, South Korea
- Founder: Yu Geung-dal
- Members: 1985: 1,125 peoples from the 274 household.; 2000: 1,597 peoples from the 497 household.; 2015: 2,544 peoples
- Connected members: Queen Sinmyeongsunseong; Yu Gwon-yeol; Yu Sin-seong; Yu Jin; Yu Jing-pil; Lady Yu; Yu Bang-ui; Yu Chung-gi; Monk Gi Hwa; Yu Jin-ryong; Yu Ae-ri
- Website: Chungju Yoo clan

- Chungju Yoo clan
- Hangul: 충주 유씨
- Hanja: 忠州 劉氏
- RR: Chungju Yussi
- MR: Ch'ungju Yussi

The Chungju Yoo clan or Chungju Yu clan (Korean: 충주 유씨; Hanja: 忠州 劉氏) is one of the noble Korean clans in the early Goryeo dynasty. Their Bon-gwan is in Chungju City, North Chungcheong Province. Their founder was Yu Geung-dal (유긍달) who was a Chungju powerful nobleman in the end of Kingdom of Unified Silla and become the father of Queen Sinmyeongsunseong, Taejo of Goryeo's first queen consort and third wife. She also become the mother of 5 princes (include Jeongjong of Goryeo, Gwangjong of Goryeo, and Great King Munwon) and 2 daughters (Princess Nakrang and Princess Heungbang). After died, Yu Geung-dal was honoured as Taesanaesaryeong (태사내사령, 太師內史令).

== List of famous Chungju Yoo members ==
=== Goryeo dynasty ===
- Queen Sinmyeongsunseong (신명순성왕후, 神明順成王后); King Sinseong's 3rd wife and 1st Queen Consort of Goryeo after his ascension to the throne, the daughter of Yu Geung-dal (유긍달) who was the founder of Chungju Yu clan.
- Yu Gwon-yeol (유권열, 劉權說); a Gwangpyeongsirang (광평시랑, 廣評侍郞) in the early Goryeo periods.
- Yu Sin-seong (유신성, 劉新城); honoured as Taebu (태부, 太傅) in 1033, he gained King Gwangjong's trusted and took an active role in the court and ascended to the highest office.
- Yu Jin (유진, 劉瑨); a Naeseungji (내승지, 內承旨) during King Gwangjong's monarch, Yibusangseo Chamjijeongsa (이부상서 참지정사, 吏部尙書 參知政事) during King Mokjong's monarch and become Sangseojwabokya (상서좌복야, 尙書左僕射) after King Hyeonjong's ascension. He served various Kings and never assigned to foreign office, later honoured as a Commander (내사령, 內史令).
- Yu Jing-pil (유징필, 劉徵弼); a Yebusirang (예부시랑, 禮部侍郎) who go to Liao dynasty in 1013 and Gukjajwaeju (국자좨주, 國子祭酒) in 1020. He become Yebusangseo (예부상서, 禮部尙書) in 1024 and Sangseojwabokya (상서좌복야, 尙書左僕射) in 1032, become Chamjijeongsa (참지정사, 參知政事) and Seogyeongyususa (서경유수사, 西京留守使) and later promoted to Prime Minister. He also promoted to be Inspector General in Naesasirang (내사시랑 동내사문하평장사, 內史侍郎同內史門下平章事) and Inspector of Seogyeong (서경유수사로). Since he served the three succession kings (Hyeonjong, Deokjong, Jeongjong), he was given many honour then.
- Lady Yu (부인 유씨, 夫人 劉氏); Deokjong of Goryeo's 5th wife and consort.
- Yu Bang-ui (유방의, 劉邦儀); a nobleman in the mid-late Goryeo dynasty. He loved learning from an early age and after graduated from a high school in Jinsa, he then married Yi Jung-yeon (이중연)'s daughter. In 1148, Yu become Samhwahyeollyeong (삼화현령, 三和縣令) but died not long after that.
- Yu Chung-gi (유충기, 劉沖墓); a Jwaganuidaebu (좌간의대부, 左諫議大夫) in 1190 and the Ambassador for the National Guard (국자감 대사성, 國字監 大司成).
- Yu Jin-ryong (유진룡), a South Korean politician who formerly served as the Minister of Culture (문화체육관광부).

==== Civil servants (문과) ====
- Yu Hui (유희, 劉羲)
- Yu Hui (유희, 劉㵙)
- Yu Gi-ryong (유기룡, 劉起龍)
- Yu Sa-pyeong (유사평, 劉師玶)

==== Military officers ====
- Yu Gye-jong (유계종, 劉繼宗)
- Yu Gwi-chang (유귀창, 劉貴昌)
- Yu Gi-rip (유기립, 劉起立)
- Yu Gi-tae (유기태, 劉基泰)
- Yu Myeong-eon (유명언, 劉命彦)
- Yu Mu-seong (유무성, 劉武成)
- Yu Mun (유문, 劉文)
- Yu Sang-ryang (유상량, 劉相良)
- Yu Sang-heon (유상헌, 劉相憲)
- Yu Eok-gu (유억구, 劉億九)
- Yu Yong-su (유용수, 劉龍水)
- Yu Ui-nam (유의남, 劉義男)
- Yu Ui-in (유의인, 劉儀仁)
- Yu Jong-rye (유종례, 劉宗禮)
- Yu Jung-rip (유중립, 劉中立)
- Yu Cheo-jin (유처진, 劉處珍)
- Yu Taek-jin (유택진, 劉澤珍)
- Yu Pil-han (유필한, 劉弼漢)
- Yu Hyeon-bok (유현복, 劉顯複)
- Yu Hong-taek (유홍택, 劉弘澤)

==== Students ====
In Saengwon (생원시)

- Yu Sa-gong (유사공, 劉師珙)
- Yu Sang-hyeon (유상현, 劉尙鉉)
- Yu Hyeon (유현, 劉俔)

In Jinsa (진사시)

- Yu Gon (유곤, 劉琨)
- Yu Eung-gwan (유응관, 劉應寬)
- Yu Hae-jing (유해징, 劉海徵)

==== Queen consorts who adopted the "Chungju Yoo clan" ====
- Queen Heonui, King Heonhwa's 2nd wife.
- Queen Mundeok, King Munui's 1st wife.
- Queen Seonjeong, King Seonyang's 1st wife.

All of them were actually from Gaeseong Wang clan (개성 왕씨), but for marriage with their relatives, they changed their clans followed maternal' line.

=== Joseon dynasty ===
- Chungju Yoo(s) produces three class-level students and 20 non-professional students in the Joseon Dynasty.
- Monk Gi Hwa (기화, 己和); a Buddhist monk in the mid-early Joseon dynasty.

== See also ==
- Korean clan names of foreign origin
- Yoo (Korean surname)
