= Crown Prince Hyodŏk =

Goryeo prince (fl. 10th century)

Prince Hyodŏk
- Born: Unknown; Kaegyŏng, Goryeo
- Died: Unknown; Kaegyŏng, Goryeo
- House: House of Wang
- Father: Daejong
- Mother: Queen Seonui
- Religion: Buddhism

Korean name
- Hangul: 효덕태자
- Hanja: 孝德太子
- RR: Hyodeok taeja
- MR: Hyodŏk t'aeja

Prince Hyodŏk (Korean: 효덕태자; Hanja: 孝德太子) was a Goryeo royal family member. He was the first son of Daejong and a grandson of Taejo, the dynasty's founder. He was the oldest brother of King Seongjong, Queen Heonae, and Queen Heonjeong. Since their parents had died when he was young, he was raised by his paternal grandmother, Queen Sinjeong alongside his siblings. Therefore, it was speculated that he lived in Hwangju where Queen Sinjeong came from. Also, since King Gyeongjong's throne was succeeded by his younger brother and not him, so it might be that he died at a young age before the time of throne's ascension.
