= Queen Wonyong =

Goryeo royal family member (fl. 11th century)

Queen Wonyong 원용왕후
- Spouse: Hyeonjong of Goryeo (m. 1013)
Posthumous name
- Wonyong (원용, 元容; "Primary and Tolerant")
- House: Chŏngju Yu clan (official); Wang (agnatic and by marriage)
- Father: Prince Gyeongjang

Queen Wonyong of the Chŏngju Yu clan (Korean: 원용왕후 유씨; Hanja: 元容王后 柳氏) was a Goryeo royal family member as the granddaughter of King Daejong, son of King Taejo who became the 5th wife of her half first cousin once removed, King Hyeonjong which she then followed her paternal grandmother's clan, the Chŏngju Yu.

Her husband's mother, Grand Queen Mother Hyosuk was initially her paternal aunt, while his first and second wife was initially her first cousin (her uncle's daughters). Yu entered the palace in 1013 (4th year reign of King Hyeonjong) as his fifth wife and was posthumously honoured as Queen Wonyong (원용왕후; 元容王后) later. They didn't have any children.
