= Crown Prince Kyŏngjang =

Goryeo prince (fl.10th century)

Prince Kyŏngjang
- Born: Unknown; Kaegyŏng, Goryeo
- Died: Unknown; Kaegyŏng, Goryeo
- Issue: Queen Wonyong
- House: House of Wang
- Father: Daejong of Goryeo
- Mother: Queen Seonui
- Religion: Buddhism

Korean name
- Hangul: 경장태자
- Hanja: 敬章太子
- RR: Gyeongjang taeja
- MR: Kyŏngjang t'aeja

Royal title
- Hangul: 황주원낭군
- Hanja: 黃州院郎君 (Note: Held this title at age about 15-16 years old in 976? not long after his second older brother's ascension to the throne.)
- RR: Hwangjuwon nanggun
- MR: Hwangjuwŏn nanggun

Prince Kyŏngjang was a Goryeo royal family member. He was the third son of Daejong and a grandson of Taejo, the dynasty's founder. He was the full brother of King Seongjong, Queen Heonae, and Queen Heonjeong. Since their parents had died when he was young, he was raised by his paternal grandmother, Queen Sinjeong alongside his other siblings. Although his wife was not recorded, he had a daughter who would become the fifth wife of King Hyeonjong.
