= Ch'oe Hang (Goryeo civil minister) =

Korean politician (?–1024)

- Hangul: 최항
- Hanja: 崔沆
- RR: Choe Hang
- MR: Ch'oe Hang

Ch'oe Hang (Korean: 최항; Hanja: 崔沆; ?–1024) was a civil minister of the Gyeongju Choe clan during the Goryeo dynasty. In 991, the 10th year of King Seongjong's reign, he entered to the court after he passed the gwageo, or civil service examination, with the highest marks. When Kim Ch'i-yang, Queen Dowager Cheonchu's lover, plotted to install their son on the throne in 1009, the 12th year of King Mokjong's reign, Ch'oe prevented the conspiracy by helping Hyeonjong ascend the throne along with Chae Chung-sun. In 1010, when he served as the post of Jeongdang munhak (政堂文學), he revived Palgwanhoe (八關會), a national Buddhist festival that had been ceased for the past 30 years.

== In popular culture ==
- Portrayed by Kim Ha-kyun in the 2009 KBS2 TV series Empress Cheonchu.
- Portrayed by Kim Jeong-hak in the 2023 KBS1 TV series Korea–Khitan War.

== See also ==
- Korean Buddhism
- Hyeonjong of Goryeo
