= Hwangbo (Korean surname) =

Korean family name (황보)

- Hangul: 황보
- Hanja: 皇甫
- RR: Hwangbo
- MR: Hwangbo

Hwangbo (Korean: 황보) is an uncommon family name in Korea. As of 2000, there were just 9,148 people by this name in South Korea. The Hwangbo surname has two clans, the Yeongcheon Hwangbo clan and the Hwangju Hwangbo clan. The name Hwangbo originated from the Chinese surname Huangfu.

== Notable people with the surname ==
- Hwangbo Je-gong, nobleman in the Early Kingdom of Goryeo
- Queen Sinjeong (Goryeo) (fl. 981–983), queen consort
- Queen Daemok (925–?), queen consort
- Hwangbo In (1387–1453), Joseon dynasty politician
- Hwangbo Kwan (born 1965), South Korean footballer
- Hwangbo Seung-hee (born 1976), South Korean politician
- Hwangbo (born Hwangbo Hyejeong, 1980), South Korean singer

== See also ==
- Korean name
- List of Korean family names
- Huangfu (Chinese surname)
