= Queen Heonjeong =

Korean queen (fl. 10th century)

Queen Heonjeong 헌정왕후
- Grand Queen Mother Hyosuk (효숙왕태후; 孝肅王太后)

Queen consort of Goryeo (posthumously)
- Coronation: 1009
- Predecessor: Queen Jeongdeok (1st); Queen Munhwa (2nd)
- Successor: Queen Seonui (1st); Queen Wonhye (2nd)
- Born: c. 966; Gaegyeong-si, Goryeo
- Died: Based on Goryeosa: 1 August 992 Wang Uk's manor, Southern from Wangnyun Temple, Gaegyeong-si, Goryeo; Based on Hyeonhwasabi: 13 April 993 Bohwa Palace, Gaegyeong-si, Goryeo
- Burial: Wolleung tomb
- Spouse: Gyeongjong of Goryeo; Anjong of Goryeo (non-married partner)
- Issue: Hyeonjong of Goryeo (with Anjong)
Posthumous name
- Queen Hyesun Inhye Seonyong Myeonggan (혜순인혜선용명간왕후; 惠順仁惠宣容明簡王后); Based on Goryeosa: Grand Queen Mother Myeonggan Seonyong Inhye Hyosuk (명간선용인혜효숙왕태후; 明簡宣容仁惠孝肅王太后); Based on Hyeonhwasabi: Royal Grand Queen Mother Hyosuk Inhye Sunseong (효숙인혜순성대왕태후; 孝肅仁惠順聖大王太后)
- House: House of Wang (by birth); Hwangju Hwangbo (by marriage)
- Father: Daejong of Goryeo
- Mother: Queen Seonui

Queen Heonjeong of the Hwangju Hwangbo clan (Korean: 헌정왕후 황보씨; Hanja: 獻貞王后 皇甫氏; c. 966–993), or formally called as Grand Queen Mother Hyosuk (Korean: 효숙왕태후; Hanja: 孝肅王太后) during her son's reign, was a Goryeo royal family member as the third daughter of Wang Uk and youngest sister of King Seongjong. She later became the fourth wife of her first cousin, King Gyeongjong. After his death, she had an affair with her half uncle, giving birth to King Hyeonjong.

Not much is known about her early life beside that she and her siblings were raised by their paternal grandmother.

== Affair with Wang Uk ==
When her husband King Gyeongjong died at the young age of 26, Heonjeong was in her mid-teens. As a widow she moved to her maternal home outside of the palace in Gaegyeong; the house was close to her half uncle Wang Uk's, located in Wangnyun Temple (왕륜사; 王輪寺), Songak Mountain. Since the law forbade the dowager queen from approaching other men, she often visited her uncle and, as they spent time together, they became close. Ten years passed: she reached her mid-twenties, while he was in his 50s.

One day, Heonjeong dreamed of climbing Songak Mountain and urinating from the peak, overflowing the country and turning it into a sea of silver water. Stunned, the queen consulted one of her maids, who was good at interpreting dreams, and the maid predicted that if she gave birth to a son, he would become the King of the nation and take over the country. The Queen said: "I am already a widow, how can I have a son?" while rebuking the maid.

One night in 991, after praying for her late husband's happiness in Wangnyun Temple, Wang Uk and the Queen confirmed each other's feelings and embraced their love. As a result, Heonjeong became pregnant.

As the people around them kept quiet, the court was unaware of their affair. Knowing what she'd done and feeling the fetus growing in her belly, the Queen was anxious and wanted to die because she was supposed to remain faithful to her late husband and not have an affair with another man, even becoming pregnant by her own uncle. While her older sister Heonae was openly affectionate with her lover Gim Chi-yang, Heonjeong was weak-hearted and trembled with anxiety. Crying in Uk's arms, she said:

"How can I do this? I'd rather die. It's all my fault. I should have kept only your heart. What do I do now that I have a child? Don't worry too much and take good care of yourself, as I'll cover all your mistakes."

According to the Goryeosa, in the seventh month of 992, while she was staying at Wang Uk's house, a slave piled up firewood in the yard and set it on fire. As soon as the flames started to spread, an official ran to put the fire out; King Seongjong, too, rushed to rescue them and, when he discovered of Heonjeong's pregnancy, he sent Uk into exile to Sasu-hyeon (modern-day Sacheon, South Korea). The records report that the Queen cried in shame and went back to her own mansion, but as soon as she reached the gate, there was a fetal movement. She held on to a willow branch and ultimately gave birth to a son, Wang Sun, but she died soon after. As Wang Sun was still young at the time, he was brought to the palace and assigned a nanny to take care of him. Sun's maternal aunt, Queen Heonae, was acting as a regent for her own son, King Mokjong, as he had no issue, but she planned to put the son she had with Kim Ch'i-yang on the throne, but Sun posed a threat to her plan; so, she threatened his life several times until the day he ascended the throne.

When he became king in 1009, Wang Sun gave his mother the title of Queen Mother and a posthumous name. She was buried along with Uk in the Wonlleung Tomb (원릉; 元陵).

== Posthumous name ==
- In May 1017 (8th year reign of King Hyeonjong), name Hye-sun (혜순; 惠順) was added.
- In June 1021 (12nd year reign of King Hyeonjong), name In-hye (인혜; 仁惠) was added.
- In April 1027 (18th year reign of King Hyeonjong), name Seon-yong (선용; 宣容) was added.
- In October 1253 (40th year reign of King Gojong), name Myeong-gan (명간; 明簡) was added to her posthumous name too.

== In popular culture ==
- Portrayed by Park Eun-bin and Shin Ae in the 2009 KBS2 TV series Empress Cheonchu.
- Portrayed by Kim Do-hye in the 2016 SBS TV series Moon Lovers: Scarlet Heart Ryeo.
