= Yi Hyŏnun =

Goryeo military commander (fl. 11th century)

- Hangul: 이현운
- Hanja: 李鉉雲
- RR: I Hyeonun
- MR: I Hyŏnun

Yi Hyŏnun (Korean: 이현운; Hanja: 李鉉雲; fl. 11th century) was a Goryeo military commander. He was a subordinate of Kang Cho.

== Biography ==
In 1009, Yi participated in Kang Cho's coup to destroy Kim Chi-yang's faction, dethrone King Mokjong and install King Hyeonjong. Prior to the coup, he was the vice military inspector (도순검부사; 都巡檢副使; tosun'gŏmbusa) of Seobukmyeon and the Vice Minister of Personnel (이부시랑; 吏部侍郞; Ibusirang). After the coup, Kang Cho merged the Security Council (중추원; 中樞院; Chungch'uwŏn), the Office of Transmission (은대; 銀臺; Ŭndae), and the Institute of Palace Miscellaneousness (선휘원; 宣徽院; Sŏnhwiwŏn) into the newly formed Palace Secretariat (중대성; 中臺省; Chungdaesŏng). Kang was appointed as the head of the Palace Secretariat, and Yi Hyŏnun, as his deputy, was made its vice head.

When the Khitan Liao invaded Goryeo in response to the coup in 1010, Yi became Kang's second-in-command, as the haengyŏng tot'ongbusa (행영도통부사; 行營都統副使) of the Goryeo army sent to fight the Khitans. Kang and Yi were both captured in battle and brought before Emperor Shengzong of Liao. Emperor Shengzong asked both men to defect and serve the Liao. While Kang Cho refused, Yi Hyŏnun accepted. He told the emperor that "Now that I have seen the bright new sun and moon with my own two eyes, how could I persist to think of the old streams and mountains?"

== In popular culture ==
- Portrayed by Choi Jun-yong in the 2009 KBS2 TV series Empress Cheonchu.
- Portrayed by Kim Jae-min in the 2023 KBS1 TV series Korea–Khitan War.
