= Queen Munhye =

- Spouse: King Munwon
- Issue: Prince Cheonchu; Prince Aji; Queen Heonui
Posthumous name
- Munhye (문혜, 文惠; "Civil and Kind")
- House: Chŏngju Yu clan (official); Wang (agnatic and by marriage)
- Father: Taejo of Goryeo
- Mother: Queen Jeongdeok of the Chŏngju Yu clan
- Religion: Buddhism

Korean name
- Hangul: 문혜왕후
- Hanja: 文惠王后
- RR: Munhye wanghu
- MR: Munhye wanghu

Queen Munhye of the Chŏngju Yu clan (Korean: 문혜왕후 유씨; Hanja: 文惠王后 柳氏) was a Goryeo princess as the first and oldest daughter of King Taejo and Queen Jeongdeok who became the wife of her half brother, King Munwon With this marriage, she then followed her maternal clan, the Chŏngju Yu. Though her younger sister, she would become the maternal aunt of King Seongjong and became the mother-in-law of her half nephew, King Gyeongjong since her only daughter married him as his second wife. Alongside her husband who was posthumously honoured as a king, she was also posthumously honoured as a queen.
