= Huangfu =

Huángfŭ (皇甫), alternatively pronounced Huangpu, is a Chinese compound surname. It's also called as Hwangbo (황보) in Korea and Hoàng Phủ in Vietnam.

== Origins ==
During the early Zhou dynasty, huangfu was the name of military office; the officer's descendants appended his name to their own to commemorate him, and thus the surname was born. In the middle Zhou dynasty, some noble of Zheng (state) became an officer of the Zhou dynasty government. Thus, the Post Huangfu (皇甫) family was founded from descendants of Wu Ji (武子) of Zheng (state). Some Huangfu (皇甫) family members founded in Song (state) in Zhou dynasty at period.

== Notable persons surnamed Huangfu ==
- Huangfu Song (?–195), Eastern Han dynasty military general
- Lady Huangfu (d. 189), Eastern Han dynasty noble lady and scholar
- Huangfu Mi (215–282), Cao Wei and Western Jin dynasty scholar and physician
- Huangfu Zhen (fl. 4th century), Former Yan official
- Huangfu Ji (皇甫績) (541–592), Sui dynasty official.
- Huangfu Ran (714? – 767?), Tang dynasty poet
- Huangfu Bo (died 820), Tang dynasty chancellor
- Huangfu Chong (皇甫冲) (1490–1558), Ming dynasty poet, one of the Four Paragons of the Huangfu Clan.
- Huangfu Xiao (皇甫涍) (1497–1556), Ming dynasty poet and politician, one of the Four Paragons of the Huangfu Clan.
- Huangfu Fang (皇甫汸) (1504–1584), Ming dynasty poet and official, one of the Four Paragons of the Huangfu Clan.
- Huangfu Lian (皇甫濂) (31 October 1508 - 2 November 1564), Ming dynasty politician of Jinshi origin, one of the Four Paragons of the Huangfu Clan.
- Huangfu Duan, fictional character in Water Margin

== Notable persons surnamed Hwangbo ==
- Hwangbo Je-gong (황보제공 皇甫悌恭), father of Queen Sinjeong and one of Three Major Grand Masters (태위 삼중대광, 太尉 三重大匡).
- Queen Sinjeong (신정왕후 황보씨; 神靜王后 皇甫氏), Taejo of Goryeo's 4th Queen Consort
- Queen Daemok (대목왕후 황보씨; 大穆王后 皇甫氏), Gwangjong of Goryeo's Queen Consort
- Hwangbo In (황보인; 皇甫仁), Prime Minister of Joseon from 1450 to 1453
- Hwangbo Kwan (황보관; 皇甫官) (b. March 1, 1965), a footballer
- Hwangbo Seung-hee (황보승희; 皇甫承希) (b. 5 August 1976), South Korean politician, Youth Chief of the People Power Party.
- Hwangbo Hyejeong (황보혜정; 皇甫惠貞) (b. 16 August 1980), South Korean singer and rapper

== See also ==
- Hwangbo (Korean name)
