= Jeungtong =

- Prince of Goryeo
- House: House of Wang
- Father: Taejo of Goryeo
- Mother: Queen Sinmyeong of the Chungju Yu clan
- Religion: Buddhism

Korean name
- Hangul: 증통국사
- Hanja: 證通國師
- Revised Romanization: Jeungtong-guksa
- McCune–Reischauer: Ch'ŭng'tong-k'uk'sa

State Preceptor Jeungtong (Korean: 증통국사; Hanja: 證通國師) was a Goryeo prince who became a Korean Buddhist monk and was the one who rebuilt Jinpyoyul Temple (진표율사). He was the fifth and youngest son of Taejo of Goryeo and Queen Sinmyeong Jeungtong rose to the rank of State Preceptor (Korean: 국사; Hanja: 國師). Later, during Joseon, the temple was repaired by King Sejo. Thousands of monks used to live in it.

== See also ==
- Wang Seokgi
- Uicheon

Preceded by Wang Jeong	Prince of Goryeo	Succeeded by Wang Uk
