= Lady Jukbang =

Lady Jukbang 죽방부인 竹房夫人

Queen consort of Silla
- Successor: Dynasty abolished (Queen Sinhye as the 1st Goryeo queen consort)
- Born: 893; Chungju, North Chungcheong Province, Silla
- Died: 954 (aged 60–61); Goryeo
- Spouse: Gyeongsun of Silla
- Issue: Gim Il; Gim Goeng; Gim Myeongjong; Lady Gim of the Gyeongju Gim clan
Posthumous name
- Queen Sowon (소원왕후; 昭元王后); Queen Jukbang (죽방왕후; 竹房王后)
- House: Juksan Bak (by birth); Gyeongju Gim (by marriage)
- Father: Bak Gwang-u
- Religion: Buddhism

Korean name
- Hangul: 죽방부인
- Hanja: 竹房夫人
- RR: Jukbang buin
- MR: Chukpang puin

Lady Jukbang of the Juksan Bak clan, was a Silla royal family as the descendant of King Pasa and primary wife of King Gyeongsun, making her the last Silla queen consort.

== Controversy ==
In other theory, Goryeosa, a historical book as the recording annals of the Goryeo period that completed in 1451 (1st year reign of Munjong of Joseon), once claimed that Jukbang was Gyeongsun's mother (羅王太后竹房夫人) or it can be regarded that she was the wife of the late king, so that she became a taehu during Gyeongsun's reign. Since there is none clear evidence despite Goryeosa that was made long time after the Silla dynasty's falls, this information somewhat can result to the mistranslation of the early Korean history.

From the other points, Gyeongsun was cited and recorded as the last king of Silla, thus, his wife, Jukbang, was regarded as the last queen consort of Silla. Yet, according to the Samguk Sagi, it was recorded that Gyeongsun's mother was the daughter of King Heongang, Queen Mother Gyea (계아태후; 桂娥太后).

== Family ==
- Father - Bak Gwang-u (박광우; 860–?)
- Unnamed mother (865–?)
- Husband - Kim Bu, King Gyeongsun of Silla (신라 경순왕; 897 — 18 May 978)
- Children
  - Son - Kim Il, Crown Prince Maui (김일 마의태자; 912–?)
  - Son - Kim Goeng (김굉; 914–967)
  - Son - Kim Myeong-jong, Duke Yeongbun, Prince Gyeongju (김명종 영분공 각간 경주군; 916–?)
  - Daughter - Lady Kim of the Gyeongju Kim clan (경주 김씨; 918–?)
