= Queen Heonsuk =

Princess of Silla (fl. 10th century)

Queen Heonsuk 헌숙왕후

Princess of Silla
- Reign: ?–?

Queen consort of Goryeo
- Tenure: ?–?
- Predecessor: Queen Daemok
- Successor: Queen Heonui
- Born: 937; Silla
- Burial: Yeongneung tomb, Neung-dong, Hwaseong, Gyeonggi Province
- Spouse: Gyeongjong of Goryeo
Posthumous name
- Queen Ongyeong Gonghyo Yanghye Uimok Sunseong Hoean Inhu Heonsuk 온경공효양혜의목순성회안인후헌숙왕후 (溫敬恭孝良惠懿穆順聖懷安仁厚獻肅王后)
- House: Gyeongju Kim (by birth) Kaseong Wang (by marriage)
- Father: Gyeongsun of Silla
- Mother: Princess Nakrang of the Kaseong Wang clan
- Religion: Buddhism

Queen Heonsuk of the Gyeongju Kim clan (Korean: 헌숙왕후 김씨; Hanja: 獻肅王后 金氏; 937–?), or known as Empress Heonseung (헌승황후; 憲承皇后), was a Silla princess and the second daughter of King Gyeongsun and Princess Nakrang. She later became a Goryeo queen consort through her marriage with King Gyeongjong as his first and primary wife.

== Posthumous name ==
- In April 1002 (5th year reign of King Mokjong), name On-gyeong (온경; 溫敬) was added.
- In March 1014 (5th year reign of King Hyeonjong), name Gong-hyo (공효; 恭孝) was added.
- In April 1027 (18th year reign of King Hyeonjong), name Yang-hye (양혜; 良惠), Ui-mok (의목; 懿穆) and Sun-seong (순성; 順聖) was added.
- In October 1056 (10th year reign of King Munjong), name Hoe-an (회안; 懷安) was added.
- In October 1253 (40th year reign of King Gojong), name In-hu (인후; 仁厚) was added to her posthumous name too.

== In popular culture ==
- Portrayed by Yang Eun-young in the 2009 KBS2 TV series Empress Cheonchu.
