= Ulsan O clan =

Korean clan from Ulsan, South Korea

- Country: Korea
- Current region: Ulsan
- Founder: O Yeon ji
- Website: http://www.ulsanoh.com/

Ulsan O clan (Korean: 울산 오씨; Hanja: 蔚山 吳氏) was one of the Korean clans. Their Bon-gwan was in Ulsan. According to the research in 1985, the number of Ulsan O clan was 2696. Their founder was O Yeon ji. O Yeon ji was a 7th descendant of Oh In yu who was a founder of Haeju Oh clan. Oh In yu came over from China during Seongjong of Goryeo’s reign in Goryeo. Oh In yu passed Imperial examination during Chungnyeol of Goryeo’s reign in Goryeo. As a result, O Yeon ji served as a munha sirang pyeongjangsa (Korean: 문하시랑평장사; Hanja: 門下侍郞平章事) and began Ulsan O clan. Then, O Yeon ji was appointed as Prince of Hakseong (Hanja: 鶴城君) because he defeated Wokou.

== See also ==
- Korean clan names of foreign origin
