= Wang Jeong =

Wang Jeong may refer to:

- Great King Munwon (fl. 10th century), son of Taejo of Goryeo
- Gangjong of Goryeo (1152–1213), king of Goryeo
- Wonjong of Goryeo (1219–1274), king of Goryeo
- Chunghye of Goryeo (1315–1344), king of Goryeo
