= Kim Sŏn =

Korean nobleman (fl. 10th century)

- Hangul: 김선
- Hanja: 金鐥
- RR: Gim Seon
- MR: Kim Sŏn

Kim Sŏn (943-?; fl. late 10th century) was a minor lord of the early Goryeo period, and the founder of the Eonyang Kim clan. He was the seventh son of Silla's last king, Gyeongsun, and his mother was the youngest daughter of Taejo, founder of the Goryeo dynasty, Princess Nakrang.

As part of Taejo's general policy of incorporating the old leadership of Silla into Goryeo, Kim Sŏn was given lordship over the Eonyang area. He was eventually given the title of Prince Eonyang (언양군).

His descendants, the Eonyang Kims, included many leading officials of Goryeo. One of these was Kim Pu-sik, a military leader and Neo-Confucian intellectual of the 12th century, author of the Samguk sagi. As of 2000, just over 38,000 South Koreans claimed descent from Kim Sŏn.

== Notes ==
1. 김알지계 김씨. Rootsinfo.co.kr. Archived from the original on 2006-01-01.
2. 성씨,본관별 가구 및 인구. Korean National Statistical Office. Archived from the original on 2006-09-07.

== See also ==
- History of Korea
- List of Goryeo people
