= Daejong of Goryeo =

Korean prince (? – 969)

Daejong 대종 戴宗
- King of Goryeo (posthumously)
- Born: Wang Uk (왕욱; 王旭); Goryeo
- Died: 969; Goryeo
- Burial: Taereung Tomb
- Spouse: Queen Seonui
- Issue: Prince Hyodeok; Wang Chi; Prince Gyeongjang an unborn daughter Queen Heonae; Queen Heonjeong
Posthumous name
- King Yeseong Hwagan Gongsin Hyeonheon Seongyeong the Great 예성화간공신현헌선경대왕 (睿聖和簡恭愼顯獻宣慶大王)
Temple name
- Daejong (대종; 戴宗)
- House: Wang
- Father: Taejo of Goryeo
- Mother: Queen Sinjeong

Daejong (died 969; (Note: In the Korean calendar (lunisolar), Daejong died in the 11th month of 969.) born Wang Uk) was a Goryeo Royal Prince as the only son of King Taejo and Queen Sinjeong, elder brother of Queen Daemok and father of King Seongjong. Through his children, he became the grandfather of Queen Wonyong and maternal grandfather to both Mokjong and Hyeonjong.

He married his younger half-sister, Queen Seonui, and had 3 sons and 3 daughters. However, both of them died in 969 and their young children were raised by his mother. After Gyeongjong's death, Uk's second son, Wang Chi, ascended the throne as Seongjong and then gave posthumous name and temple name to his late parent. He and his wife were buried in Taereung Tomb (태릉; 泰陵).

== Family ==
Parents

- Father: Taejo of Goryeo (31 January 877 – 4 July 943)
- Mother: Queen Sinjeong of the Hwangju Hwangbo clan (d.19 August 983)
- Sister: Queen Daemok

Consorts and their respective issue(e):

- Queen Seonui of the Chŏngju Yu clan
  - Crown Prince Hyodeok, first son
  - Seongjong of Goryeo (15 January 961 – 29 November 997), second son
  - Prince Gyeongjang, third son
  - Unnamed princess, first daughter
  - Queen Heonae of the Hwangju Hwangbo clan (964 – 20 January 1029), second daughter
  - Queen Heonjeong of the Hwangju Hwangbo clan (d. 993), third daughter

== Posthumous name ==
- In April 1002 (5th year reign of King Mokjong), name Hwa-gan (화간; 和簡) was added.
- In March 1014 (5th year reign of King Hyeonjong), name Gong-sin (공신; 恭愼) was added.
- In April 1027 (18th year reign of King Hyeonjong), name Hyeon-heon (현헌; 顯獻) was added to his posthumous name.

== In popular culture ==
- Portrayed by Jung Gook-jin in the 2002–2003 KBS TV series The Dawn of the Empire.
- Portrayed by Im Joo-hwan in the 2015 MBC TV series Shine or Go Crazy.
- Portrayed by Kang Ha-neul in the 2016 SBS TV Series Moon Lovers: Scarlet Heart Ryeo.
