= Great King Munwon =

Korean prince (fl. 10th century)

Great King Munwon 문원대왕 文元大王

Prince of Goryeo
- Reign: ?–?
- Predecessor: Prince Wang So
- Successor: Prince Jeungtong

Posthumously King of Goryeo
- Successor: King Jeonggan
- Born: Wang Jeong; Goryeo
- Spouse: Queen Munhye
- Issue: Prince Cheonchu; Prince Aji; Queen Heonui; Lady Su-Mi
Posthumous name
- Munwon (문원, 文元; "Civil and Primary")
- House: House of Wang
- Father: Taejo of Goryeo
- Mother: Queen Sinmyeong of the Chungju Yu clan
- Religion: Buddhism

Korean name
- Hangul: 왕정
- Hanja: 王貞
- RR: Wang Jeong
- MR: Wang Chŏng

Posthumous name
- Hangul: 문원대왕
- Hanja: 文元大王
- RR: Munwon daewang
- MR: Munwŏn taewang

Great King Munwon (born Wang Jeong) was a Korean royal prince as the 5th son of Taejo of Goryeo and Queen Sinmyeong, also the younger brother of Tae, Yo and So. He later married his half sister, had 2 sons and a daughter who would eventually become the 2nd wife of King Gyeongjong, his nephew. Although his death date was unclear, it considered that he died during the latter half of Gwangjong's reign.

== Family ==
Parents

- Father: Wang Geon, Taejo of Goryeo (왕건 고려태조; 31 January 877 – 4 July 943)
- Mother: Queen Sinmyeongsunseong of the Chungju Yu clan (신명순성왕후 충주 유씨)

Consorts and their respective issue(e):

- Queen Munhye of the Chŏngju Yu clan (문혜왕후 류씨), his half-sister
  - Prince Cheonchu (천추전군), 1st son
  - Prince Aji (아지군), 2nd son
  - Queen Heonui of the Chungju Yu clan ( 헌의왕후 유씨), 1st daughter
    - Son-in-law: Gyeongjong of Goryeo

== In popular culture ==
- Portrayed by Ji Soo in the 2016 SBS TV Series Moon Lovers: Scarlet Heart Ryeo.
