= Queen Heonui =

Queen Heonui 헌의왕후

Queen consort of Goryeo
- Tenure: ?–?
- Predecessor: Queen Heonsuk
- Successor: Queen Heonae
- Spouse: Gyeongjong of Goryeo
Posthumous name
- Heonui (헌의, 獻懿; "Virtuous and Benign")
- House: Chungju Yu clan (official); Wang (agnatic and by marriage)
- Father: Great King Munwon
- Mother: Queen Munhye
- Religion: Buddhism

Queen Heonui of the Chungju Yu clan (Korean: 헌의왕후 유씨; Hanja: 獻懿王后 劉氏) was a Goryeo royal family member as the daughter of Wang Jeong and a granddaughter of King Taejo who became a queen consort through her marriage with her first cousin, King Gyeongjong as his second wife. From this marriage, Queen Heonui became the second reigned Goryeo queen who followed her maternal clan after Queen Daemok, her mother-in-law and formerly aunt.

== In popular culture ==
- Portrayed by Choi Young-wan in the 2009 KBS2 TV series Empress Cheonchu.
