= Queen Sinhye =

Goryeo queen (fl. 10th century)

Queen Sinhye 신혜왕후

Queen consort of Goryeo
- Tenure: 918–?
- Coronation: 918
- Predecessor: Dynasty established: Consort Kang (Kung Ye's wife) as the last Queen Consort of Taebong; Queen Jukbang as the last Queen Consort of Silla
- Successor: Queen Janghwa
- Born: ? Silla
- Died: ? Gaeseong, Goryeo
- Burial: Hyeolleung tomb
- Spouse: Taejo of Goryeo
Regnal name
- Princess Consort Hadong (하동군부인, 河東郡夫人; given before Goryeo established)
Posthumous name
- Sinhye (신혜, 神惠; "Divine and Kind")
- House: Chŏngju Yu clan
- Father: Yu Ch'ŏn-gung
- Religion: Buddhism

Queen Sinhye of the Chŏngju Yu clan (Korean: 신혜왕후 유씨; Hanja: 神惠王后 柳氏) was the first Goryeo queen consort through her marriage as the first wife of Wang Kŏn, its founder. As the wife and mother of the new nation, she supported her husband's national affairs with a good plan and received great favor and preferential treatment from many people, also become his favourite wife.

== Biography ==
The future Queen Sinhye was born into a rich family as the daughter of Yu Ch'ŏn-gung, a local chief from Jeongju.

According to legend, Wang Kŏn, a general commander under Kung Ye was passing through the land of Chŏngju with his armies to invade Later Baekje. He was resting his horses and sat under an old willow tree to rested for a while. In there, he happened to see and met a young girl standing by the brook of the road. While he seeing her virtuous face, he asked:

"Whose daughter are you?" ("누구의 딸이냐?")

And that girl said:

"I am the daughter of the chief in this village." ("이 고을의 장자長者집 딸입니다.")

Wang immediately fell in love with her beautiful appearance and wisdom at first sight and stayed at her father's mansion that day where he prepared and served food to all the army members in a very prosperous manner. The girl's father, Lord Yu ordered his daughter to sleep with Wang. Not long after that, Wang immediately left for the battlefield and they lost contact each other, so she then shaved her hair to keep her chastity and became a nun. Meanwhile, Wang learned this belatedly and hurriedly found her, brought her and married her.

At the end of the Taebong period, when Sin Sung-gyŏm, Hong Yu (홍유), Pae Hyŏn-gyŏng (배현경; 裵玄慶), and Pok Chigyŏm (복지겸; 卜智謙) came to seek to drive out Kung Ye in protest against his tyrannical reign and wanted to appoint Wang as the new king, he stubbornly refused and didn't accept it, but hesitated at the same time. Knowing this, Lady Yu then said:

"It has been done since ancient times to defeat greed with righteousness. Now that I have heard the stories of the generals, even women and children will be thrilled and exited. General, what more can I say?"
"의(義)로써 탐학함을 물리치는 것은 예로부터 해온 일입니다. 지금 여러 장군들의 이야기를 들으니 아녀자도 분발하겠거늘 하물며 대장부께서야 더 말해 무엇하겠습니까?"

She encouraged her husband to put on his own armor and participated in protest to start a revolution.

In 918, her husband overthrew Kung Ye and established the new dynasty, she became the Queen consort. She assisted the national ambassador with good schemes and distinguished herself by assisting her husband with the establishment of important national policies, thus she received favor and preferential treatment. She also achieved integrity, docile and wise in serving her husband, that made her honoured as Princess Consort Hadong (하동군부인; 河東郡夫人). As such, the Queen received the utmost respect and admiration from many of her peoples, her husband for her contribution in helping the establishment of the Goryeo dynasty.

Meanwhile, they were childless and didn't have any issue.

Based on

== In popular culture ==
- Portrayed by Park Sang-ah in the 2000–2002 KBS1 TV Series Taejo Wang Geon.
