= Yu Ch'ŏn'gung =

Later Three Kingdoms Korean nobleman

- Born: Unified Silla
- Died: Goryeo
- Issue: Queen Sinhye
- House: Chŏngju Yu clan
- Occupation: Three Major Grand Masters (삼중대광; 三重大匡)

Korean name
- Hangul: 유천궁
- Hanja: 柳天弓
- RR: Yu Cheongung
- MR: Yu Ch'ŏn'gung

Yu Ch'ŏn'gung (Korean: 유천궁; Hanja: 柳天弓) or also known as Local Chief Yu (유장자; 柳匠子) was a rich-nobleman of the Later Three Kingdoms period who became the father of Queen Sinhye and father in-law of Wang Kon, Goryeo's founder.

During Jinseong of Silla's reign, Yu Ch'ŏn'gung was a nobleman from Paseo region (along with Wang Ryung from Songak, Pak Chi-yun from Pyeongju, Hwangbo Che-gong from Hwangju, etc.) specially from "Jeongju Region" (정주; 貞州). Since he was a wealthy man who accumulated wealth through Commerce through the sea, the locals called him as a "local chief" (장자; 長者; changja). Although the local lords of the Paseo region were independent from Kung Ye, they finally surrendered to him and Wang's son, Wang Kon, became Kung Ye's general and took over the western coast (including Ganghwa Island. Yu was said to have treated Wang's army generously and had his daughter, the future Queen Sinhye, sleep with Wang. Yu actively provided ship technology and knowledge acquired through maritime trade to Wang. Yu's domain of Jeongju Port became an outpost where Wang's naval forces could build ships and train to conquer Geumseong (Naju) in Later Baekje. After the establishment of Goryeo dynasty, Yu became one of the Threefold Great Rectifers (삼중대광; 三重大匡; samjungdaegwang) (along with Pak Yŏnggyu and Hwangbo Che-gong) and had the most strong influence in the early Goryeo.

== In popular culture ==
- Portrayed by Kim Jin-hae in the 2000–2002 KBS1 TV series Taejo Wang Geon.
- Portrayed by Kim Soo-il in the 2002–2003 KBS TV series The Dawn of the Empire.

== See also ==
- Pak Yŏnggyu
- Hwangbo Che-gong
