= Gyeongsun of Silla =

56th monarch of Silla (r. 927–935)

Gyeongsun
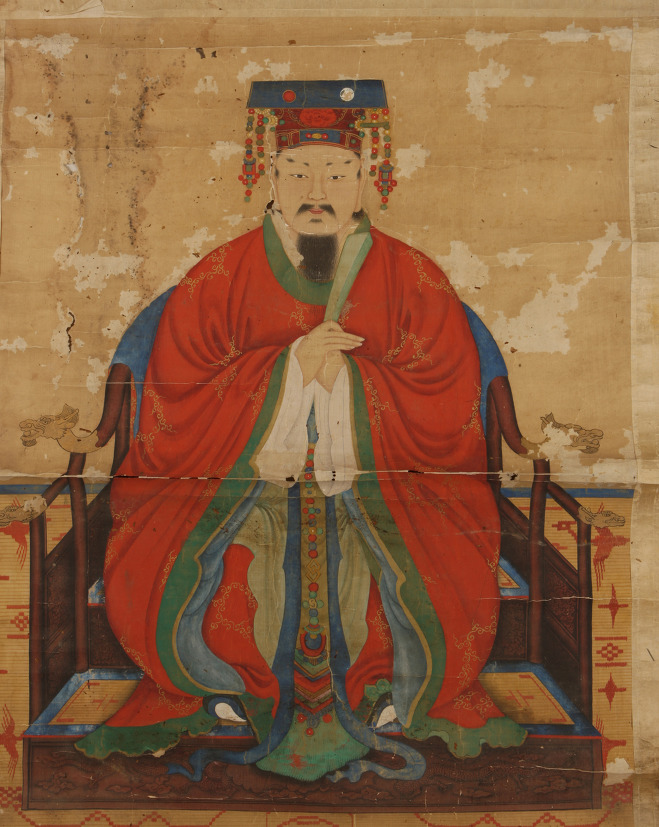
- Copy of a contemporary portrait of Gyeongsun

King of Silla
- Reign: 927–935
- Coronation: 927
- Predecessor: Gyeongae of Silla
- Successor: Dynasty abolished (Taejo of Goryeo as the King of Goryeo)
- Born: 897; Unified Silla
- Died: 978 (aged 80–81); Goryeo
- Consort: Lady Jukbang; Princess Nakrang
- Issue Among others...: Crown Prince Maui; Queen Heonsuk
- House: House of Kim
- Father: Kim Hyo-Jong
- Mother: Princess Gyea
- Religion: Buddhism

Korean name
- Hangul: 김부
- Hanja: 金傅
- RR: Gim Bu
- MR: Kim Pu

Monarch name
- Hangul: 경순왕
- Hanja: 敬順王
- RR: Gyeongsunwang
- MR: Kyŏngsunwang

Gyeongsun (897–978), personal name Kim Pu, was the 56th and final ruler of the Koreanic kingdom Silla.

== Biography ==
A sixth-generation descendant of King Munseong, he was the son of Kim Hyo-Jong by Princess Gyea, who was the daughter of King Heongang. His wife was Lady Jukbang (죽방부인) of the Juksan Park clan, his eldest son was Crown Prince Maui, and his youngest son was Beomgong.

Gyeongsun was placed on the throne by the Later Baekje king Kyŏn Hwŏn after the Hubaekje forces sacked Gyeongju in 927 and forced Gyeongsun's predecessor to commit suicide. Kyŏn had specifically placed Gyeongsun on the throne to fracture Silla's alliance with Goryeo. The kingdom was already in an extremely weakened state, so Gyeongsun reigned over a tiny remnant of the former Silla territory until finally abdicating in favour of Taejo of Goryeo in 935. Gyeongsun led his officials to Songak for the official ceremony, heading a convoy filled with treasures and beautiful women that extended for more than thirty Li. Taejo of Goryeo waited for Gyeongsun in the Goryeo capital's suburbs and then formalized Gyeongsun's submission by marrying his eldest daughter, Princess Nangrang, to him (낙랑공주) and was appointed sasim-gwan (사심관, inspector-general) of Gyeongju, becoming the first of Goryeo's sasim-gwan system. Taejo married Gyeongsun's uncle's daughter who became one of Taejo's many queens. She would later become the grandmother of Goryeo King Hyeonjong of Goryeo.

He lived out the remainder of his life near the Goryeo capital (modern-day Kaesong). He died in 978 and his tomb lies in Jangnam-myeon, Yeoncheon County, Gyeonggi Province, South Korea.

According to the Samguk sagi, Gyeongsun's son, Crown Prince Maui, objected to his father's submission to Goryeo and became a hermit in Mount Kumgang.

== Worship ==
In Korean shamanism, Gyeongsun is worshiped as one of Wangshin (Korean: 왕신; Hanja: 王神; lit. 'King god').

== Family ==
- Father: Kim Hyo-jong, King Shinheung of Silla (신흥대왕; 877 – ?)
  - Grandfather: King Uiheung of Silla (의흥대왕; 857 – 915)
  - Unnamed grandmother (856 – 916)
- Mother: Queen Mother Gyea of the Gyeongju Kim clan (계아태후 김씨; 886 – ?)
  - Grandfather: King Heongang of Silla (신라 헌강왕; 861 – 886)
  - Grandmother: Queen Mother Uimyeong of the Gyeongju Kim clan (의명왕태후 김씨; 861 – ?)
- Consorts and their Respective Issue:
1. Lady Jukbang of the Juksan Park clan (죽방부인 박씨; 893 – 954)
  1. Kim Il, Crown Prince Maui (마의태자; 912 – ?), sixth son
  2. Kim Goeng (김굉; 914 – 967), seventh son
  3. Kim Myeong-jong, Duke Yeongbun (영분공; 916 – ?), eighth son
  4. Lady Kim of the Gyeongju Kim clan (경주김씨; 918 – ?), second daughter
2. Lady Ahn of the Sunheung Ahn clan (순흥 안씨; 899 – ?)
  1. Kim Deok-ji (김덕지; 920 – ?), tenth son
3. Princess Nakrang of the Kaesong Wang clan (낙랑공주 왕씨; 897 – ?)
  1. Lady Kim of the Gyeongju Kim clan (경주김씨; 913 – ?), first daughter
  2. Kim Seok, Prince Uiseong (김석 의성군; 922 – ?), eleventh son
  3. Kim Eun-yeol, Prince Daean (김은열 대안군; 934 – 1028), twelfth son
  4. Lady Kim of the Gyeongju Kim clan (경주김씨; 936 – ?), third daughter
  5. Queen Heonsuk of the Gyeongju Kim clan (헌숙왕후 김씨; 937 – ?), fourth daughter
  6. Kim Kŏn, Prince Gangreung (김건 강릉군; 940 – ?), thirteenth son
  7. Kim Sŏn, Prince Eonyang (김선 언양군; 943 – ?), fourteenth son
  8. Kim Chu, Prince Samcheok (김추 삼척군; 946 – ?), fifteenth son
  9. Kim Ryeo-gyeong (김려경), Lady Kim of the Gyeongju Kim clan (950 – ?), fifth daughter
4. Princess Wang of the Kaesong Wang clan (개성 왕씨) – No issue.
5. Lady Songhui of the Seok clan (송희부인 석씨; 885 – ?)
  1. Kim Jeon (김전; 901 – 935), first son
  2. Kim Yo (김요; 903 – ?), second son
  3. Kim Gon (김곤; 905 – 935), third son
  4. Kim Bun (김분; 907 – ?), fourth son
  5. Kim Yeong (김영; 907 – ?), fifth son
  6. Kim Jeong (김정; 917 – ?), ninth son
6. Lady Ahn (안씨; 920 – ?)

== In popular culture ==
- Portrayed by Shin Hwi-shik in the 2000–2002 KBS TV series Taejo Wang Geon.
- Portrayed by Lee Do-ryun in the 2002–2003 KBS TV series The Dawn of the Empire.

== See also ==
- Kim Il Sung – The founder and the Eternal President of North Korea is a descendant of Gyeongsun as part of the Kim clan.
- Democratic People's Republic of Korea (North Korea, the DPRK or the DPR Korea)
- Kyŏn Hwŏn
- Kim T'aesŏ
- List of Korean monarchs
- List of Silla people
- Later Three Kingdoms of Korea

Gyeongsun of Silla House of Kim Died: 978
Regnal titles
Preceded by Gyeongae	King of Silla; Silla; 927–935	Succeeded by Kingdom annexed by Goryeo
