= Kim Ch'iyang =

Goryeo civil official (died 1009)

- Hangul: 김치양
- Hanja: 金致陽
- RR: Gim Chiyang
- MR: Kim Ch'iyang

Kim Ch'iyang (Korean: 김치양; Hanja: 金致陽; ? – March 2, 1009) was a Goryeo civil official. He was the favourite and lover of the widowed Queen Dowager Cheonchu, King Mokjong's mother, and had a son with her. He attempted a rebellion in order to install their son on the throne, but was stopped by military inspector Kang Cho, who killed both Kim and the king.

== Biography ==
Kim Ch'iyang hailed from the Tongju Kim clan, based on modern-day Sŏhŭng County, North Korea. He may have possibly been a descendent of Kim Haeng-p'a, a Tongju regional lord who was a supporter of Wang Kŏn. He was a maternal relative of Queen Dowager Cheonchu, also known as Queen Heonae. Upon the death of King Gyeongjong, the husband of Queen Heonae, Kim Chi'yang disguised himself as a monk to enter the palace and began a relationship with Queen Heonae. According to the Goryeosa, Kim's penis was large enough to be used as an axle for a carriage wheel. However, the lovers were discovered and Kim was sent into exile by King Seongjong. However, with the death of King Seongjong, Queen Heonae's son, Mokjong, ascended to the throne and Heonae became Queen Dowager Cheonchu and Mokjong's regent. Using her powers as regent, she recalled her lover, Kim from exile. He was appointed to the position of secretarial receptionist (통사사인; 通事舍人; t'ongsa sain) of the Office of Audience Ceremonies. He would later be promoted to the offices of Vice Director of the Right (우복야; 右僕射; ubogya) and the State Finance Commissioner (삼사사; 三司使; samsasa), and abused his power and authority.

Kim used his authority to place members of his political faction in the royal court, such as Yi Chujŏng (이주정; 李周禎). In 1003, his son with Queen Dowager Cheonchu was born. In order to have their son succeed the throne, Kim and the Queen Dowager forced the legitimate heir, Prince Daeryangwon (the later King Hyeonjong), to take the vows and become a Buddhist monk. They also sent assassins to eliminate Prince Daeryangwon, but the attempts never succeeded. On February 13, 1009, a large fire broke out in the palace and King Mokjong suffered from shock and became ill. Kim Ch'iyang attempted this opportunity to seize power and place his son on the throne. However, the king had called for the military inspector of Seobukmyeon, Kang Cho, to return to the capital and stop Kim. On March 2, Kang Cho executed both Kim and his son but also dethroned King Mokjong and installed Prince Daeryangwon as King Hyeonjong.

== In popular culture ==
- Portrayed by Lee Jin-suk and Kim Suk-hoon in the 2009 KBS2 TV series Empress Cheonchu.
- Portrayed by Gong Jung-hwan in the 2023 KBS2 TV series Korea–Khitan War.
