= Queen Seonui (Goryeo) =

Korean queen (fl. 10th century)

- Grand Queen Mother Seonui (선의왕태후; 宣義王太后)
- Burial: Taereung tomb
- Spouse: Daejong of Goryeo
- Issue: Prince Hyodeok; Prince Gaeryeong; Prince Hwangju; An unborn daughter Queen Heonae; Queen Heonjeong
Posthumous name
- Queen Jeongsuk Jeongmok Gwangui Ikja Seonui 정숙정목광의익자선의왕후 (貞淑靜穆匡懿益慈宣義王后)
- House: Chŏngju Yu clan (official); Wang (agnatic and by marriage)
- Father: Taejo of Goryeo
- Mother: Queen Jeongdeok of the Chŏngju Yu clan
- Religion: Buddhism

Queen Seonui of the Chŏngju Yu clan (Korean: 선의왕후 유씨; Hanja: 宣義王后 柳氏) or formally called Grand Queen Mother Seonui (Korean: 선의왕태후; Hanja: 宣義王太后), was a Goryeo princess, second daughter of King Taejo and Queen Jeongdeok. She married her half brother, Daejong of Goryeo, giving birth to three sons (among which King Seongjong), and two daughters, Queen Heonae and Queen Heonjeong.

Seonui and her husband died when their children were still young, so they were raised by their paternal grandmother. Both she and her husband were posthumously honoured as a king and queen after their second son, Wang Chi, ascended the throne.

== Posthumous name ==
- In April 1002 (5th year reign of King Mokjong), name Jeong-suk (정숙; 貞淑) was added.
- In March 1014 (5th year reign of King Hyeonjong), name Jeong-mok (정목; 靜穆) was added.
- In April 1027 (18th year reign of King Hyeonjong), name Gwang-ui (광의; 匡懿) was added.
- In October 1253 (40th year reign of King Gojong), name Ik-ja (익자; 益慈) was added to her posthumous name too.
