= Crown Prince Maui =

Last Silla crown prince (fl. 10th century)

- Hangul: 김일
- Hanja: 金鎰 or 金溢
- RR: Gim Il
- MR: Kim Il

Royal title
- Hangul: 마의태자
- Hanja: 麻衣太子
- RR: Maui taeja
- MR: Maŭi t'aeja

Crown Prince Maui (Korean: 마의태자; Hanja: 麻衣太子; born 912), born Kim Il (김일; 金鎰) was the last Silla crown prince as the son of its last ruler, King Gyeongsun.

The name Maui means "hemp dress", and comes from the fact that he spent his whole life wearing clothes made of hemp linen when he went into self-imposed exile after the fall of Silla. Due to the decline of Silla, which had lost control over much of its former territory and had its capital brutally sacked, his father surrendered Silla to Goryeo. After hearing the news, Prince Maui opposed the surrender and fled to Mount Kumgang. Currently, the Buan Kim clan and the T'ongch'ŏn Kim clan regard Prince Maui as their founding ancestor.

== In popular culture ==
=== TV series & dramas ===
- Portrayed Lee Byung-wook in the 2000–2002 KBS1 TV series Taejo Wang Geon.
- Portrayed by Ahn Chi-yong in the 2009 KBS TV series Empress Cheonchu.

=== Novel ===
- Portrayed in a historical novel Crown Prince Maui, written by Yi Gwangsu and was serialized in The Dong-A Ilbo from May 1926 to January 1927. It was published in January 1928 as a book in the Bakmunseogwan (博文書館). The story tells the life of Maui as a young man on Mount Kumgang, after his father, Gyeongsun of Silla, tried to surrender to Taejo of Goryeo.
