= Hwangju Hwangbo clan =

Korean clan from North Hwanghae Province

Hwangju Hwangbo clan 황주 황보씨
- Parent family: Hwangbo clan
- Country: Korea
- Current region: Inje-ri, Ingyo-myeon, Hwangju-gun, North Hwanghae Province
- Origin: Hwangju County, Hwanghae Province, North Korea
- Founder: Hwangbo Je-gong
- Members: Based to the research held in 2000, the member was 258 peoples from the 79 household.
- Connected members: Queen Sinjeong; Hwangbo Yu-ui; Hwangbo Geum-san; Hwangbo Wi-gwang; Hwangbo Gwang-gyeom; Hwangbo Yeong; Hwangbo Yang; Hwangbo Heo
- Website: Hwangju Hwangbo clan

- Hwangju Hwangbo clan
- Hangul: 황주 황보씨
- Hanja: 黃州 皇甫氏
- RR: Hwangju Hwangbossi
- MR: Hwangju Hwangbossi

The Hwangju Hwangbo clan (Korean: 황주 황보씨; Hanja: 黃州 皇甫氏) is one of the Korean clans. Their Bon-gwan is in Hwangju, North Hwanghae Province. Hwangbo clan is originally was Huangfu (Chinese surname) and brought by Hwangbo Gyeong (황보경) from Tang dynasty to Silla dynasty. Their founder was Hwangbo Je-gong (황보제공) who was a nobleman in the Paegangjin, Hugoguryeo that become the father in-law of Kingdom of Goryeo's founder, Taejo of Goryeo as his daughter was Taejo's 4th Queen Consort, Queen Sinjeong. He served Taejo as one of his Three Major Grand Masters (태위 삼중대광, 太尉 三重大匡). Then he officially began the Hwangju Hwangbo clan.

== List of famous Hwangju Hwangbo members ==
- Queen Mother Sinjeong (신정왕태후 황보씨, 神靜王太后 皇甫氏); Taejo of Goryeo's 4th wife and 2nd Queen Consort after ascension to the throne, the daughter of Duke Chungui (충의공) who was the founder of Hwangju Hwangbo clan.
- Hwangbo Yu-ui (황보유의, 皇甫兪義); a Naesamunhapyeongjangsa (내사문하평장사, 內史侍郞同內史門下平章事).
- Hwangbo Geum-san (황보금산, 皇甫金山); a Daesang (대상, 大相) who served Taejo of Goryeo.
- Hwangbo Wi-gwang (황보위광, 皇甫魏光); a Jwayun (좌윤, 佐尹) who served Gwangjong of Goryeo.
- Hwangbo Gwang-gyeom (황보광겸, 皇甫光謙); a prime minister during Gwangjong of Goryeo's reign.
- Hwangbo Yeong (황보영, 皇甫穎); a Pyeongjangsa (평장사) who served Jeongjong of Goryeo.
- Hwangbo Yang (황보양, 皇甫讓); a Eosajapdan (어사잡단, 御史雜端) who served from Munjong of Goryeo until Injong of Goryeo.
- Hwangbo Heo (황보허, 皇甫許); a Jeonjungsieosa (전중시어사, 殿中侍御史) who served in the 1106 during the first year reign of Yejong of Goryeo.
- Hwangbo Chan (황보찬, 皇甫瓚, 1796 - ?); a Samdeung (삼등, 三等) who served in 1867 during the fourth year reign of Gojong of Korea.
- Hwangbo Gyu (황보규, 皇甫珪)
- Hwangbo Bin (황보빈, 皇甫贇)
- Hwangbo Sang (황보상, 皇甫尙)
- Hwangbo Jun (황보준, 皇甫峻)
- Hwangbo Heung (황보흥, 皇甫興)
- Hwangbo Yeong (황보영, 皇甫嶸)

== See also ==
- Korean clan names of foreign origin
- Hwangbo (Korean surname)
- Yeongcheon Hwangbo clan
