= Queen Sinmyeongsunseong =

Goryeo queen consort (fl. 10th century)

Queen Sinmyeong 신명왕후

Queen consort of Goryeo
- Tenure: ?–943
- Predecessor: Queen Janghwa
- Successor: Queen Uihwa

Queen dowager of Goryeo
- Tenure: 945–949
- Coronation: 945
- Predecessor: Dynasty established (Queen Mother Gyeongsun as the last Queen dowager of Silla)
- Successor: Queen Dowager Sinjeong
- Monarch: King Jeongjong (son); King Gwangjong (son)
- Born: ? Chungju, North Chungcheong Province
- Died: ? Goryeo
- Spouse: Taejo of Goryeo
- Issue: Wang Tae; Wang Yo; Wang So; Wang Jeong; Jeungtong; Princess Nakrang; Princess Heungbang
Regnal name
- Grand Lady Chungjuwon (충주원대부인; 忠州院大夫人); Queen Mother Sinmyeongsunseong (신명순성태후; 神明順成太后); Grand Queen Mother Sinmyeongsunseong (신명순성왕태후; 神明順成王太后)
- House: Chungju Yu clan
- Father: Yu Geung-dal (유긍달)

Queen Sinmyeong of the Chungju Yu clan (Korean: 신명왕후 유씨; Hanja: 神明王后 劉氏) or long-called as Queen Sinmyeongsunseong (Korean: 신명순성왕후; Hanja: 神明順成王后; lit. 'Sinmyeong, the Accomplishment and Holy Queen') was the third Goryeo queen consort through her marriage as the third wife of Wang Geon, its founder and become the mother of his 5 sons (include Jeongjong and Gwangjong) and 2 daughters.

During Taejo's lifetime, she was addressed as Grand Lady Chungjuwon (충주원대부인; 忠州院大夫人; "Grand Lady of the Chungju Courtyard"). Then, during their sons' reign, she was addressed as Queen Mother Sinmyeongsunseong (신명순성태후; 神明順成太后) and Grand Queen Mother Sinmyeongsunseong (신명순성왕태후; 神明順成王太后). She was the first woman whom Wang Geon met after his ascension to the throne and became the first one who held the position of "Queen Mother" and "Grand Queen Mother" of Goryeo.

== In popular culture ==
- Portrayed by Jeon Mi-seon in the 2000–2002 KBS1 TV series Taejo Wang Geon.
- Portrayed by Jung Young-sook in the 2002–2003 KBS TV series The Dawn of the Empire.
- Portrayed by Ji Soo-won in the 2015 MBC TV series Shine or Go Crazy.
- Portrayed by Park Ji-young in the 2016 SBS TV series Moon Lovers: Scarlet Heart Ryeo.
