= Hwangbo Che-gong =

Korean nobleman (fl. 10th century)

Hwangbo Che-gong 황보제공
- Occupations: Three Major Grand Masters (태위 삼중대광; 太尉 三重大匡)
- Known for: Founder of Hwangju Hwangbo clan
- Title: Duke Chungui (Korean: 충의공; Hanja: 忠義公)
- Children: Queen Sinjeong
- Father: Master Hwangbo (황보씨)

Korean name
- Hangul: 황보제공
- Hanja: 皇甫悌恭
- RR: Hwangbo Jegong
- MR: Hwangbo Chegong

Posthumous name
- Hangul: 충의
- Hanja: 忠義
- RR: Chungui
- MR: Ch'ungŭi

Hwangbo Che-gong (Korean: 황보제공; Hanja: 皇甫悌恭) of the Hwangju Hwangbo clan (황주 황보씨) was a nobleman in the Early Kingdom of Goryeo periods. He was the father of Queen Sinjeong and become the fourth father in-law of Taejo of Goryeo also the maternal grandfather of Daejong of Goryeo and Queen Daemok. He served as Grand Commandant (태위; 太尉; t'aewi), a senior first rank official. He also held the position of a Threefold Great Rectifer (삼중대광; 三重大匡; samjungdaegwang) and become the founder of Hwangju Hwangbo clan.

== In popular culture ==
- Portrayed by Park Jung-woong in the 2002–2003 KBS TV series The Dawn of the Empire.
- Portrayed by Woo Sang-jeon in the 2015 MBC TV series Shine or Go Crazy.

== See also ==
  - Pak Yŏng-gyu
  - Yu Ch'ŏn-gung
