= Princess Nakrang (Goryeo) =

Princess of Goryeo (fl. 10th century)

Princess Nakrang 낙랑공주

Princess of Goryeo
- Predecessor: Dynasty established (Herself as the first Princess of Goryeo)
- Successor: Princess Heungbang
- Monarch: Wang Geon, King Taejo

Royal consort of Silla
- Successor: Princess Wang
- Born: 897; Kaseong, Goryeo
- Died: ? Kaseong, Goryeo
- Spouse: Gyeongsun of Silla (m. 912)
Regnal name
- Princess Anjeong Sukui (안정숙의공주; 安貞淑義公主); Lady Sinran [Sil'lan] (신란궁부인; 神鸞宮夫人)
Posthumous name
- Hyomok (효목; 孝穆)
- House: Kaeseong Wang (by birth); Gyeongju Kim (by marriage)
- Father: Taejo of Goryeo
- Mother: Queen Sinmyeong of the Chungju Yu clan

Princess Nakrang (Korean: 낙랑공주; Hanja: 樂浪公主; 897–?), also known as Princess Anjeong Sugui (안정숙의공주; 安貞淑儀公主) or Lady Sillan (신란궁부인; 神鸞宮夫人; lit. 'Lady of the Sillan Palace'), was a Goryeo princess as the first daughter of King Taejo and Queen Sinmyeong who became the wife of King Gyeongsun of Silla. As the oldest, Princess Nakrang became the first Goryeo Princess (born from a queen).

== Family ==
- Father -Taejo of Goryeo (고려 태조; 31 January 877 – 4 July 943)
  - Grandfather - Sejo of Goryeo (고려 세조) (847–897)
  - Grandmother - Queen Wisuk of the Han clan (위숙왕후 한씨) (850–?)
- Mother - Queen Sinmyeong of the Chungju Yu clan (신명왕후 유씨) (880–?)
  - Grandfather - Yu Geung-dal (유긍달) (853–?)
- Husband - Gyeongsun of Silla (신라 경순왕; 896–978)
- Issue
  - Daughter - Lady Kim of the Gyeongju Kim clan (경주김씨; 913 – ?)
  - Son - Kim Seok, Prince Uiseong (김석 의성군; 922 – ?)
  - Son - Kim Eun-yeol, Prince Daean (김은열 대안군; 934 – 1028)
  - Daughter - Lady Kim of the Gyeongju Kim clan (경주김씨; 936 – ?)
  - Daughter - Queen Heonsuk of the Gyeongju Kim clan (헌숙왕후 김씨; 937 – ?)
  - Son - Kim Geon, Prince Gangreung (김건 강릉군; 940 – ?)
  - Son - Kim Seon, Prince Eonyang (김선 언양군; 943 – ?)
  - Son - Kim Chu, Prince Samcheok (김추 삼척군; 946 – ?)
  - Daughter - Kim Ryeo-gyeong (김려경), Lady Kim of the Gyeongju Kim clan (950 – ?)

== In popular culture ==
- Portrayed by Lee Kan-hee in the 2002–2003 KBS TV Series The Dawn of the Empire.
