= Queen Heonae =

Queen consort of Goryeo (964–1029)

Queen Heonae 헌애왕후

Queen consort of Goryeo
- Tenure: 980–981
- Coronation: 980
- Predecessor: Queen Heonui
- Successor: Queen Mundeok

Queen dowager of Goryeo
- Tenure / Regency: 997–1009
- Coronation: 997
- Predecessor: Queen Dowager Sinjeong
- Successor: Queen Dowager Inye
- Regent Monarch: King Mokjong (son)
- Born: 964; Hwangju, Goryeo
- Died: 20 January 1029 (aged 64–65); Sungdeok Palace, Gaeseong-si, Goryeo
- Burial: Yureung tomb
- Spouse: Gyeongjong of Goryeo
- Issue: Mokjong of Goryeo (with Gyeongjong); Son with unknown name (with Kim Ch'i-yang)
Regnal name
- Queen Dowager Cheonchu (천추태후; 千秋太后); Grand Queen Dowager Heonae (헌애왕태후; 獻哀王太后; given by Hyeonjong of Goryeo)
Posthumous name
- Grand Queen Dowager Eungcheon Gyeseong Jeongdeok 응천계성정덕왕태후 (應天啓聖靜德王太后)
- House: Hwangju Hwangbo clan (official); Wang (agnatic and by marriage)
- Father: Daejong of Goryeo
- Mother: Queen Seonui

Queen Heonae of the Hwangju Hwangbo clan (Korean: 헌애왕후 황보씨; Hanja: 獻哀王后 皇甫氏; 964 – 20 January 1029), or formally called Grand Queen Dowager Heonae (Korean: 헌애왕태후; Hanja: 獻哀王太后), was a Goryeo royal family member as the second and oldest daughter of Wang Uk, and younger sister of King Seongjong who became a queen consort through her marriage with her half first cousin, King Gyeongjong as his third wife. After his death, she served as a regent from 997 to 1009 as regent of her son, King Mokjong. From this marriage, Queen Heonae became the third Goryeo queen who adopted her maternal clan's surname after Queen Heonui, her half first cousin. She is better known as Queen Dowager Cheonchu (Korean: 천추태후; Hanja: 千秋太后).

== Biography ==
=== Early life and background ===
The future Queen Heonae was born in 964 as the second and oldest daughter of Wang Uk, and his wife and half sister, Lady Yu. She had three brothers and a younger sister who would become the biological mother of the 8th ruler, King Hyeonjong. As her parents died young, she and her siblings were raised by their paternal grandmother, Queen Sinjeong. By then, Heonae and her younger sister adopted Sinjeong's Hwangbo clan of Hwangju as their surname, which they used even after marrying their half first cousin. Beside that, not much records are left about the young queen's life.

=== Marriage and succession to the throne ===
Alongside her younger sister, Heonae entered King Gyeongjong's palace not long after his ascension and she became his third queen consort. Shortly after this, the new queen became pregnant and Gyeongjong was said to be very happy since he didn't have any heirs from the other two queens: the lack of an heir was a concern, so at the same time Heonae became pregnant, she became his favorite one. Finally, she gave birth to their oldest son (Wang Song), which made the king more delighted.

In 981, King Gyeongjong died and Heonae's second older brother Wang Ch'i succeeded her husband's throne as King Seongjong over her son who was still 2 years old at that time. The Queen then left the palace and stayed outside from it. The new king, who tried to make Confucianism became the state religion, emphasized purity and chastity towards his two younger sisters. Later on, Seongjong, who had no sons, issued the order that his nephew Wang Song would be his successor and took him to the palace, raising him like his own son. Wang Song then ascended the throne in 997 after his maternal uncle's death and chose his mother to become his regent. She then stayed in Cheonchu Hall (천추전; 千秋殿), Cheonchu Palace (천추궁; 千秋宮), leading to her being known as Queen Dowager Cheonchu.

=== Scandal with Kim Ch'i-yang ===
Meanwhile, after King Gyeongjong's death, Heonae met Kim Ch'i-yang, who came from the Tongju Kim clan and became pretended to be a monk early on. Heonae had a secret relationship with Kim Ch'i-yang. When it became public, caused a scandal in the palace, and Seongjong responded by sending Kim into exile.

=== Regency ===
As a queen dowager and regent, she summoned Kim to the palace and appointed him as a government official, giving him the position of secretarial receptionist (통사사인; 通事舍人; t'ongsa sain) of the Office of Audience Ceremonies. Under her patronage, Kim was promoted repeatedly until he reached the offices of Vice Director of the Right (우복야; 右僕射; u pogya) and the State Finance Commissioner (삼사사; 三司使; samsa sa), that were in charge of both financial and personnel rights, which conferred enormous power. In addition, he implemented a policy of giving preference to Seogyeong, the hometown of Queen Dowager Cheonchu, built conduits and temples in various places, such as the Seongsu Temple (성수사; 星宿寺) in Tongju, his birthplace.

Shortly thereafter, in 1003, they eventually had a son together and Kim then conspired to set their son on the throne to succeed the childless King Mokjong. For this reason, the queen dowager and Kim repeatedly tried to kill her own nephew, Wang Sun, as he was an obstacle to their young son's accession, but failed every time.

Although Wang Sun's birth was unusual, his father was a son of the Goryeo's founder too, so Wang Sun was able to live under King Seongjong's extreme protection when the king was still alive. However, Sun's life became threatened when the king died due to an illness. Even after Mokjong came of age, the queen dowager still acted as his regent and held the biggest power in the court, alongside Kim. Meanwhile, it was believed that the queen dowager forced Wang Sun to leave the royal palace by forcing him to become a monk and tried to kill him by sending people several times after him.

When Kim burned Manwoldae, a royal palace, to the ground, threatened to kill the King and take over, King Mokjong recalled the military inspector of Seobukmyeon, Kang Cho, to the capital city and Gang immediately executed Kim and his supporters. Then, the scholar officials, who were enemies of Kang, spread rumors and lies that the general was planning to take over the government for himself. These rumors reached the King and he planned to kill Kang. Hearing of the conspiracy and the doubts of the king, Kang Cho ordered his army to attack and kill all of his enemies, including the king.

=== Later life and death ===
Kang Cho then led a coup and dethroned King Mokjong, placing Wang Sun on the throne. Heonae and Mokjong got exiled, but Mokjong was assassinated by his subordinates in Jeokseong-myeon, Paju on the way to Chungju, their detention site. As a result, the queen dowager was completely overthrown from the Goryeo politics in 1009 and General Gang, alongside his allies, appointed her nephew Wang Sun as the new King and ruler of Goryeo.

Soon after, she was released from exile and lived in Hwangju for 21 years, then returned to the royal palace on King Hyeonjong's 20th year of reign (1029). She then died at 66 years old in her chamber, Sungdeok Palace (숭덕궁; 崇德宮) in Gaegyeong. Meanwhile, there was a theory that she did not return to the palace but instead died in Myeongbok Palace in Hwangju. She was later buried in Yureung tomb (유릉; 幽陵).

== In popular culture ==
- Portrayed by Chae Shi-ra and Kim So-eun in the 2009 KBS2 TV series Empress Cheonchu
- Portrayed by Lee Min-young in the KBS2 TV series Korea–Khitan War.
