= Shin Ae =

South Korean actress and model (born 1982)

- Born: Jo Shin Ae; March 13, 1982 (age 44); Seoul, South Korea
- Spouse: Park Jae-gwan (m. 2009)
- Children: 3

Korean name
- Hangul: 조신애
- Hanja: 趙申愛
- RR: Jo Sinae
- MR: Cho Sinae

Shin Ae (Korean: 신애, born March 13, 1982) is a South Korean actress and model.

== Career ==
Although debuting as an actress on SBS drama series Medical Center in 2000, as well as being a model for major endorsement companies such as LG Cyon and Olay, Shin Ae mainly portrayed supporting characters on television, her biggest roles being in KBS's Summer Scent in 2003, and Empress Cheonchu in 2009.

Her popularity skyrocketed when she was cast in MBC's reality show We Got Married with Clazziquai member Alex. Although they departed in the 8th episode due to Alex's schedule conflicts, they returned in the 13th episode.

On October 2, 2008, Shinae's close friend Choi Jin-sil committed suicide, shocking the nation. Netizens assumed that the emotional impact would cause Shinae to leave the show. However, it was later revealed that they would leave the show anyway, for the reason of filming schedule conflicts for Shinae's drama Empress Cheonchu.

Alex and Shin Ae made their official exit from the show on November 16, 2008.

== Personal life ==
On May 28, 2009, Shinae married Park Jae Gwan, a close family friend, at Sheraton Walker Hill Hotel in Seoul. After two years of marriage in August 2011 she announced she was pregnant with her first child with husband Park Jae Gwan.

== Filmography ==
=== TV series ===
- Medical Center, SBS, 2000
- Four Sisters, MBC, 2001
- Summer Scent, KBS, 2003
- War of the Roses, MBC, 2004
- More Beautiful Than a Flower, KBS, 2004
- Empress Cheonchu, KBS, 2009

=== Films ===
- Season in the Sun, 2003
- The Silver Knife, 2003

=== Music video appearances ===
- "Gloomy Sunday" (글루미 선데이), Chae Dong-ha, 2002
- "Please Remember" (외워 두세요), Sung Si-kyung, 2003
- "I..." (난...), Ock Joo-hyun, 2003
- "Just Once" (한번만), 2NB, 2005

=== Variety shows ===
- X-Man, SBS, 2006
- We Got Married, MBC, 2008
