= Ch'oe Uch'ŏng =

Goryeo government official

- Hangul: 최우청
- Hanja: 崔遇淸
- RR: Choe Ucheong
- MR: Ch'oe Uch'ŏng

Ch'oe Uch'ŏng (Korean: 최우청; Hanja: 崔遇淸; ? – August 8, 1184 (Note: In the Korean calendar (lunisolar), he died on the 1st day of the 7th Lunar month of the 14th year of Myeongjong's reign (1184).)) was a Goryeo civil official who served from the reign of King Injong until King Myeongjong. Ch'oe was the progenitor of the Chungju Ch'oe clan.

== Biography ==
Considered as the apical ancestor of the Chungju Ch'oe clan, Ch'oe Uch'ŏng was the son of vice director of the Chancellery (문하시랑; 門下侍郎; munhasirang), Ch'oe Ok (최옥; 崔沃). Ch'oe first started out as a hyangni (local functionary) in Chungju. He passed the kwagŏ in the reign of King Injong, and became the assistant magistrate (현위; 縣尉; hyŏnwi) of Jillye. Ch'oe was the Master of Divination (전첨; 典籤; chŏnch'ŏm) of Myeongjong's household bureau before Myeongjong was enthroned as king by the ringleaders of the 1170 military coup. Due to Ch'oe ties to the king before his enthronement, he was trusted and favoured by the king. Upon becoming king, Myeongjong promoted Ch'oe to a censor (대간; 臺諫; taegan).

Ch'oe helped the government suppress two different rebellions. In 1174, he was appointed as a deputy provincial military commander (병마부사; 兵馬副使; pyŏngma pusa) for the suppression of the rebellion of Cho Wich'ong (조위총; 趙位寵). For his feats during the conflict, Ch'oe was promoted to a ritual master of the Kukchagam (국자좨주; 國子祭酒; kukcha chwaeju). In 1177, he was promoted to the left grand master of remonstrance (좌간의대부; 左諫議大夫; chwa kanŭi taebu). As the military commissioner (병마사; 兵馬使; pyŏngmasa) of Sŏbungmyŏn (서북면; 西北面), Ch'oe Uch'ŏng also put down a rebellion by Chŏngju commandant (정주도령; 靜州都領; Chŏngju toryŏng) Sun Pu (순부; 純夫) and junior colonel (낭장; 郎將; nangjang) Kim Sung (김숭; 金崇). On January 14, 1181, (Note: In the Korean calendar (lunisolar), the 27th day of the 12th Lunar month of the 10th year of Myeongjong's reign (1180).) he was appointed as a commissioner of the Security Council (추밀원사; 樞密院使; ch'umilwŏnsa) and the advisor to the heir apparent (태자빈객; 太子賓客; t'aeja pin'gaek).

In 1183, Ch'oe requested to retire at the age of 72. This was over the regular retirement request age of 70, which caused him to receive criticism. According to the Koryŏsa chŏryo, it stated that the people of Ch'oe's time ridiculed him for his late retirement. Ch'oe died on August 8, 1184.
