= Empress Cheonchu =

2009 South Korean period television series

- Promotional poster
- Also known as: The Iron Empress
- Written by: Son Young-mok; Lee Sang-min; Kang Young-ran
- Directed by: Shin Chang-suk; Hwang In-hyuk
- Starring: Chae Shi-ra; Kim Suk-hoon; Choi Jae-sung; Lee Deok-hwa; Kim Ho-jin; Shin Ae
- Opening theme: "Opening" (various artists)
- Country of origin: South Korea
- No. of episodes: 78

Production
- Executive producer: Kim Won-yong
- Producer: Jin Hyung-wook KBS
- Camera setup: Multi-camera
- Running time: Wednesday and Thursday at 21:30
- Production company: KBS self-production

Original release
- Network: KBS2
- Release: January 1 – September 30, 2009

Empress Cheonchu (Korean: 천추태후; Hanja: 千秋太后; also known as The Iron Empress) is a 2009 South Korean period television series based on the title character, an actual historical figure and her lifelong struggle to protect the country her ancestors built. The granddaughter of Goryeo dynasty founder Taejo Wanggeon, the empress ruled as the regent for her son Mokjong, the dynasty's seventh ruler. Determined to realize her ambitious goals for the kingdom of Goryeo, she dons armor, battles against foreign invaders, and tramples her lover, her son and brother in her rise to power.

== Synopsis ==
The drama is based on the historical Dowager Queen Empress Cheonchu of the Goryeo, who fought against the Liao dynasty in order to achieve her Grandfather's personal dream of reclaiming old lands lost over the years to other associated tribes and countries such as the Khitans and some Jurchens.

The series largely revolves around her desire to influence and win back her son (later known as Mokjong) from her brother Seongjong when he decided to have his nephew succeed him as ruler. Seongjong deemed her unacceptable to raise the boy in preparation of his future as Emperor and has his barren wife raise the boy as their son.

This causes a lot of conflict between Seongjong and his sister despite their continual working together to maintain the country from external and internal threats such as the Khitan invasion and various royal court intrigues and power struggles.

There are several liberties taken in the series the most obvious is that Mokjong is depicted as having epilepsy which is part of the reason General Gang Jo later removes him from ruling the country. There are no known records supporting the supposition that the historical Mokjong had epilepsy.

== Cast ==
=== Main ===
- Chae Shi-ra as Hwangbo Soo, later Empress Cheonchu
  - Kim So-eun as young Hwangbo Soo
- Kim Suk-hoon as Kim Chi-yang
  - Lee Jin-suk as young Kim Chi-yang
- Choi Jae-sung as Gang Jo
- Lee Deok-hwa as General Gang Gam-chan
- Kim Ho-jin as Wang Wook, Prince Gyeongjuwon
- Shin Ae as Hwangbo Seol, later Empress Heonjeong
  - Park Eun-bin as young Hwangbo Seol

=== Supporting ===
==== Goryeo Royal family ====
Emperor and rulers

- Jo Myung-nam as King Taejo (cameo)
- Jung Seung-woo as King Gwangjong (cameo)
- Choi Cheol-ho as King Gyeongjong
  - Cha Jae-dol as young Gyeongjong
- Kim Myung-soo as Prince Hwangjuwon, later King Seongjong
  - Choi Woo-hyuk as young Prince Hwangjuwon
- Lee In as King Mokjong (Gyeongjong and Empress Cheonchu's son)
  - Park Ji-bin as young Mokjong
- Kim Ji-hoon as Prince Daeryangwon, later King Hyeonjong (Wang Uk and Empress Heonjeong's son)
  - Kim Jin-woo, Kang Soo-han, Choi Soo-han as young Prince Daeryangwon
- Baek Min-hyun as Kim Jin, Prince Hwangjuso (Empress Cheonchu and Kim Chi-yang's son, Mokjong's half younger brother)
  - Choi Ki-joo as young Kim Jin

People around Taejo

- Ban Hyo-jung as Empress Dowager Sinjeong
  - Taejo's 4th wife who represents the position of the Hwangju supporters and raised all of her grandchildren instead of her son and daughter-in-law who died early. However, she became angry and died suddenly when her grandson, Seongjong whom she trusted betrayed her.
- Jang Hee-soo as Princess Chungju
  - One of Taejo's granddaughter who treated harshly and imprisoned during Empress Cheonchu's coup. She accepts Hyeonjong who went to Mongjin, but when the Khitan pursuers arrive, she tries to betray him but then shot with an arrow by Empress Cheonchu own.

People around Gwangjong

- Lee Young-ah as Empress Daemok (cameo)
  - Gwangjong's primary wife and formerly half sister who killed by his sword while trying to prevent the attempt to kill their son (the-young-Gyeongjong) during Gwangjong's slaughtering politics.

People around Gyeongjong

- Yang Eun-yong as Empress Heonsuk (cameo)
- Choi Young-wan as Empress Heonui (cameo)
- Jang Hee-soo as Lady Daemyeong

People around Seongjong

- Lee Hyun-kyung as Empress Mundeok
  - Baek Seung-hee as young Empress Mundeok
  - Gwangjong's daughter and Seongjong's 1st wife who always been coldly ignored by him although she already kind to him. Despite her position as the first queen, she later completely ill and dies alone.
- Moon Jeong-hee as Empress Munhwa
  - Kim Min-ji as young Empress Munhwa
  - Kim Won-sung's daughter whom originally about marry Gyeongjong, but later instead became Seongjong's concubine. With the restraint of the Hwangju's power who found out about her family, she was promoted to the queen position. She initially kind and care with her husband's family, but soon after he fell ill and she acted as deputy for a while, she then slowly shows her desire for power. When he died in anger because of stress, she harbors hostility to Empress Cheonchu and working with Kim Won-sung and Silla peoples to interfere with Empress Cheonchu. Although she applies that to Cheonchu almost every time, but she still survives under Mokjong's protection. After Kim Chi-yang's rebellion, she choose her own daughter as Hyeonjong's primary wife so she can entered the palace again. After preventing the second invasion of the Khitan, Hyeonjong who had a stronger voice, told her to not too meddle in politics which she then laughed by Empress Cheonchu when they meet again.
- Kim Yoon-hee as Lady Yeonchang (Seongjong's 3rd wife and Choi Haeng-eon's daughter)

People around Mokjong

- Lee In-hye as Empress Seonjeong
  - Han Bo-bae as young Empress Seonjeong
  - Empress Mundeok's daughter who raised by Seongjong, her stepfather from child. She later married Mokjong, but since they two were grow up like a sibling from young, so Mokjong doesn't like or see her as a spouse. As she never has any children, so they are living in a cold state and suffer only from hardships here and there. Even so, she cares and always follow his mother, Empress Cheonchu until the end of the episode.
- Lee Tae-im as Kim Mil-hwa, Lady Yoseok
  - A woman who forget her real identity as Kim Won-Sung's subordinate and succeeded in gaining Mokjong's favor, but failed to have children. In the end, she later commits adultery with Kim Yung-dae, who is her biological older brother and have a child with him. She then caught by the guard and killed by an angry minister.

People around Hyeonjong

- Park Si-eun as Empress Wonjeong
  - Lee Ra-hye as young Empress Wonjeong
  - Seongjong and Princess Yeonheung's daughter who has a good personality and take good care of her parent. However, she only receives cold treatment from Hyeonjong, her husband.
- Jung Han-bi as Empress Wonseong (Hyeonjong's 2nd wife and Kim Eun-bu's 1st daughter)
- Park Hye-bin as Empress Wonhye (Hyeonjong's 3rd wife and Kim Eun-bu's 2nd daughter)
- Jung In-seo as Empress Wonpyeong (Hyeonjong's 7th wife and Kim Eun-bu's 3rd daughter)

==== Minister of Foreign Affairs ====
- Im Hyuk as Seo-Hee, Gyeongjong, Seongjong and Mokjong's people.
- Jeon Moo-song as Lee Ji-baek, Gyeongjong and Seongjong's people.
- Won Suk-yeon as Lee Kyum-ui, Gyeongjong and Seongjong's people.

==== Goryeo's warriors ====
- Choi Jun-yong as Yi Hyun-woon
  - Chief of Demonstration Army, he is Seongjong, Mokjong, and Hyeonjong's army.
- Choi Dong-joon as Dae Do-soo
  - Actually the last Balhae Crown Prince, Prince Dae Kwang-hyun's son. He became Seongjong and Mokjong's warrior, also served Hyeonjong as his general and later great general.
- Lee Won-bal as Yoo-Bang, Seongjong's warrior who served Mokjong and Hyeonjong's as their 6th rank general.
- Park Chul-ho as Kim-Hoon, Seongjong's warrior who became Mokjong's 6th rank general and Hyeonjong's great general.
- Choi Wang-soon as Choi-Jil, Seongjong's warrior who became Mokjong's 6th rank general and Hyeonjong's great general.
- Jeon Byung-wook as Yoon Su-ahn, Seongjong's warrior who goes to war during the 1st Khitan-Liao invasion on Goryeo.
- Hong Il-kwon as Yang Kyu, Seongjong's warrior who becomes Mokjong's and Hyeonjong's great general.
- Hong Sung-ho as Kim Suk-heung, Seongjong's people, also Mokjong and Hyeonjong's 5th rank military officer.
- Lee Byung-wook as Ha Kong-jin, Mokjong and Hyeonjong's 5th rank military officer.
- Jeon Seung-bin as Ji Chae-moon, Mokjong and Hyeonjong's 5th rank military officer.
- Kim Joo-ho as Kang Min-chum, Hyeonjong's great general.
- Lee Il-jae as Kim Jong-hyun, Hyeonjong's warrior in Chungju Palace.
- Jung Ui-kap as Tak Sa-jung, Mokjong's general in Yongho Palace and later Hyeonjong's people.
- Choi Oh-shik as Choi Sa-wi, Mokjong's general in Eungyang Palace and later Hyeonjong's people.
- Jang Soon-kook as Yoo-Jong, Mokjong and Hyeonjong's 5th rank military officer.
- Yoo Jong-keun as Ahn-Pae, Seongjong's people who also served as Mokjong and Hyeonjong's 5th rank military officer.
- Park Jin-hyung as No-Ui, Seongjong's 5th rank military officer and later Mokjong and Hyeonjong's 6th rank military officer.

==== Silla's peoples ====
- Lee Ki-yul as Choi-Sum, Gyeongjong and Seongjong's people.
- Kim Byung-ki as Kim Won-soong, Seongjong's in-law and people. He is Silla's warrior.
- Kim Jong-kyeol as Choi-Ryang, Seongjong's teacher and people. He is Silla's warrior.
- Park Ji-il as Kim Shim-eon, Mokjong's teacher and Choi-Seom's son-in-law. He is Mokjong and Seongjong's people.
- Oh Wook-chul as Jo-Sun, Kim Won-sung's henchman and a Silla Warrior.
- Jo Byung-kon as Lee-Yang, a Silla Warrior who become Seongjong's people.
- Lee Joon-woo as Seol Shin-yoo, a Silla Warrior who become Seongjong's people.
- Ahn Chi-yong as Crown Prince Maui, the last Crown Prince of Silla and Kim Chi-yang's grandfather. (cameo)
- Yoon Young-mok as Kim-Joon, Crown Prince Maui's son and Kim Chi-yang's father. He is the head of the Silla revival force for Goryeo. (cameo)

==== Other nobles ====
- Jeon Sung-hwan as Choi Ji-mong, Gyeongjong's people.
- Maeng Ho-rim as Park Yang-yoo, Seongjong's people.
- Im Byung-ki as Han Un-kong, Seongjong's people.
- Kim Young-sun as Han In-kyung, Seongjong and Mokjong's people.
- Kim Ha-kyun as Choi-Hang
  - A Silla nobleman and warrior who become Hyeonjong's teacher and trusted people. He also served Mokjong and Hyeonjong.
- Kim Hyo-won as Chae Choong-soon, Mokjong and Hyeonjong's people.
- Kim Joo-young as Hwangbo Yoo-ui, Mokjong and Hyeonjong's people.
- Hwang Bum-shik as Kim Eun-boo, Hyeonjong's people and father-in-law.
- Bae Do-hwan as Choi Won-shik, Choi-Hang's son who become Mokjong and Hyeonjong's people.
- Jo Jung-kook as Choi-Sook, Choi Seung-ro's son who become Mokjong and Hyeonjong's people.
- Kim Kyung-ryong as Moon In-wi, Mokjong's archery in Cheonchu Palace firstly but later become Hyeonjong's people. He is Kim Chi-yang's henchman.

==== Peoples in Myeongbok Palace ====
- Hong In-young as Chun Hyang-bi, a Warrior in Myeongbok Palace and Empress Cheonchu's bodyguard. She is Kang-Jo's wife.
  - Kim Ye-won as young Chun Hyang-bi
- Kim Mi-ra as Lee Seol-hwa, a Martial Arts Instructor in Myeongbok Palace.
- Kim Byung-choon as Lee Joo-jung, a Warrior in Myeongbok Palace and Lee Seol-hwa's father.
- Ahn Hae-sook as Court Lady Yoon, a court lady in Myeongbok Palace.
- Kim Hae-eun as Soo-Ri, a warrior in Myeongbok Palace.

==== Maids ====
- Ko Kyu-pil as Jang Myung-kil – Hyeonjong's eunuch.
- Han Shi-hoon as Lee Park-dol – Hyeonjong's eunuch.
- Park Jin-woo as Yoo Haeng-kan – Mokjong's eunuch and trusted people.
- Na Kyung-min as Yoo Choong-jung – Mokjong's eunuch.
- Jung-Jin as Ko-Hyun – Gyeongjong, Seongjong, and Mokjong's eunuch.
- Jung Seung-woo as Eunuch Yang – Gyeongjong, Seongjong, and Mokjong's eunuch.
- Ji Jong-eun as Court Lady Jo – Queen Munhwa's court lady and Jo-Sun's little sister.
- Jo Myung-hee as Court Lady Kim – Mokjong, Hyeonjong, and Empress Cheonchu's court lady.

==== Khitan-Liao peoples ====
- Shim Hye-jin as So Jak, Empress Yeji (Xiao Chuo)
  - Khitan-Liao's Empress Dowager and Emperor Seongjong's mother.
- Jang Dong-jik as Yayul Yung-seo, Emperor Seongjong (Khitan-Liao's 6th Emperor)
  - Oh Gun-woo as young Yayul Yung-seo (Yelü Longxu)
- Yoo Ho-rip as So Chal-li
  - Khitan-Liao's Princess and So Son-nyung's daughter. She is Emperor Seongjong's wife.
- Lee Jin-woo as Han Deok-yang (Han Derang)
  - Empress Yeji's trusted person and Khitan-Liao's prime minister.
- Ji Dae-han as So Son-nyung (Xiao Xunning)
- Jung Heung-chae as So Bae-ap (Xiao Baizhi)
- Kim Myeong-kuk as Yayul Jeok-ryeol (Yelü Dilie), Khitan-Liao's great general.
- Yoon Yong-hyun as Yayul Jeok-ro (Yelü Dilu), Khitan-Liao's great general.
- Kim Sung-Hyun as Yayul Bun-no (Yelü Pennu), Khitan-Liao's great general.
- Lee Han-sol as Yayul Mu-ki, Khitan-Liao's great general.
- Yeom Chul-ho as Yayul Cho (Yelü Chu), Khitan-Liao's great general.
- Lee Un-jung as Hyul-Mae, Empress Yeji's escort.
- Na Jong-soo as Soo-No, Khitan-Liao's great general.
- Lee Eun-jung as Dok-Yun, Empress Yeji's escort.
- Park Jung-Min as Sa-Ryang, Sa Ka-moon and Dok-Yun's son.

==== Others ====
- Kim Hyung-min as Sa Ka-moon, Kim Chi-yang's close aides.
- Lee Chae-young as Sa Il-ra, Kim Chi-yang's close aide and Sa Ka-moon's little sister. She later become Empress Cheonchu's bodyguard.
- Kwon Hyuk-ho as Kim Yoong-dae – Lady Yoseoktaek's boyfriend and a trader in Gyeongju.
- Kim Jong-kook as a Merchant seller, Kim Chi-yang's people.
- Min Ji-oh as Kang-Shin, Kang-Jo's little brother and Khitan-Liao's inspector.
- Kang Shin-jo as Jo-Doo, Kim Won-soong's henchman and top companion.
- Jung Doo-kyum as Lee Mong-jun, Goryeo's people who become Khitan-Liao's 1st officer.
- Hwang Yoon-kul as Jang-Young, Goryeo's people who become Khitan-Liao's 2nd officer.
- Song Keum-shik as Wang-Seung, a Goryeo's Great General.
- Park Byung-ho as a Buddhist monk in Jingwan Grand Temple and Sinhyul Temple, Goryeo.
- Song Yong-tae as Mo Bool-la, Sa Ka-moon's maternal grandfather.
- Kang Ki-sung as Kang-Moo, Kang-Jo and Kang-Shin's father and a Great General of Jungahn State.
- Jang Dae-woong as Choo-Yong, Kang-Jo's informant and people.
- Ha Sung-kwang as Chae-Ki, a Khitan-Liao's Great General and Kang-Sin's former lieutenant.
- Jung Gye-young as Chun Hyang-sun, Chun Hyang-bi's big sister and Kang-Jo's fiancée.
- Jo So-young as So-Hwa, Yang-Kyoo's fiancée.
- Shin Woo-chul as Kang-Sin's bodyguard.
- Seo Jang-suk as Kang Kam-chan's bodyguard.
- Seo Sung-ha as Yayul Cho's bodyguard.
- Im Jin-taek as Yayul Mu-ki's bodyguard.
- Ji Sung-hwan as Wang-Seung's assistant, Goryeo and Khutan-Liao's great general.

=== Extended cast ===
- Lee Woo-suk as a Goryeo great general
- Shin Joon-young as a Goryeo general
- Heo In-koo as a Goryeo general
- Goo Joong-rim as a Goryeo general
- Park Sung-kyoon as a Goryeo general
- Choi Dong-yup as a Goryeo nobleman who become Khitan-Liao's general
- Oh Sung-yul as a Goryeo nobleman
- Park Yong-jin as a Goryeo nobleman
- Maeng Bong-hak as a palace maid
- Na Jae-kyoon as a palace maid
- Heo Ki-ho as a palace maid
- Oh Kil-joo as a palace maid
- Han Tae-il as a palace maid
- Kim Kang-il as a general
- Choi Ik-joon as a Buddhist monk
- Im Jae-keun as a Buddhist monk
- Lee Young-ho as a Buddhist monk
- Jang Moon-suk as a Buddhist monk
- Jeon Hun-tae as a Khitan-Liao's general
- Kim Yoon-tae as a Khitan-Liao's general
- Kim Jae-kwon as a Khitan-Liao's general
- Yoon Kap-soo as a Khitan-Liao's nobleman
- Kwon Da-hyun as Emperor Seongjong's bodyguard
- Go In-bum as a Mayor in Sasu County
- Shin Soon-hee as the Mayor in Sasu County's wife
- Gong Jae-won as a Sasu County people
- Pyo Chul-hwan as a Sasu County people
- Yoo Byung-joon as a Military officer from Song dynasty
- Seo Dong-soo as a nobleman from Song dynasty
- Lee Jung-sung as a Seogyeong officer
- Kwon Byung-kil as a Seonju officer
- Son Sun-keun as a Seonju people
- Ji Sung-keun as a Seonju people
- Park Jong-sul as a chief of Jagi Village
- Park Jung-sang as 사가문 수하
- Ki Se-hyung as 사가문 수하
- Kim Joo-hwan as 사가문 수하
- Lee Jae-woo as 사가문 수하
- Lee Bong-kyoo as a gist (chief) in Hangye Temple
- Baek Yoon-heum as Ja-kaek
- Yoo Soon-chul as 철소 노인
- Kim Do-sung as a Gukjagam's mayor
- Nam Yoo-hyun as the real Kim Chi-yang
- Lee Nak-joon as an envoy
- Lee Jong-park as Ahn Yoong-jin's lieutenant
- Heo Maeng-ho as a refugees from Balhae
- Jung Hye-young as a maid in Prince Gaeryeong's mansion hall
- Kim Choon-ki as a Yeonju Village's mayor (Yanzhou Village)
- Choi Yoon-joon as a Seogyeong's merchant
- Jeon Hae-ryong as a Seogyeong's merchant
- Yoo In-suk as a refugees
- Byeon Shin-ho as 산파
- Kim Kook-bin as a Khitan-Liao's giant man
- Seo Min-kyung as Chun Hyang-bi's mother
- Park Il-mok as a Goryeo eunuch
- Seo Chan-ho as Kim Sook-heung's opponent
- Im Ha-na as Kim Mil-hwa's maid
- Ahn Jin-soo as a people who near from Sinhyeol Temple
- Sung In-ja as a people who near from Sinhyeol Temple's wife
- Hwang Duk-jae as Kim Chi-yang's people
- Yang Jae-won as Kim Chi-yang's people
- Lee Hoon-sung as Kim Chi-yang's people
- Choi Byung-mo as a protesters' general
- Son Jung-min as Mang Na-ni
- Yoo Seung-won as a private army from Chungju Palace
- Oh Yong-taek as a private army from Chungju Palace
- Park Jong-il as a private army from Chungju Palace
- Jeon Il-bum as a Gaegyeong people
- Jung Jong-hyun as a Gaegyeong people
- Kim Kwang-in as a Gaegyeong people
- Lee Seung-ki as a Gaegyeong people
- Kim Yun-soo as a Gisaeng
- Yuhm Ji-hye as a Gisaeng
- Jang Jin-shil as a Gisaeng
- Lee Ko-eun as a Gisaeng
- Han Ah-reum as a Gisaeng
- Han Hye-ryun as a Gisaeng
- Park Soo-hyuk as a Jinjang's general manager
- Won Hyun-joon
- Choi Sung-woong
- Shin Shin-bum
- Hong Seung-mo
- Wang Tae-un
- Baek Seung-hoon
- Ga Deuk-hee

== Awards and nominations ==
Year	Award	Category	Recipient	Result
2009	KBS Drama Awards	Top Excellence Award, Actress	Chae Shi-ra	Won
2009	KBS Drama Awards	Excellence Award, Actor in a Serial Drama	Kim Suk-hoon	Won
2009	KBS Drama Awards	Excellence Award, Actor in a Serial Drama	Choi Jae-sung	Nominated
2009	KBS Drama Awards	Excellence Award, Actress in a Serial Drama	Shim Hye-jin	Nominated
2009	KBS Drama Awards	Best Supporting Actor	Choi Cheol-ho	Won
2009	KBS Drama Awards	Best Supporting Actor	Kim Myung-soo	Nominated
2009	KBS Drama Awards	Best Supporting Actress	Moon Jeong-hee	Won
2009	KBS Drama Awards	Best New Actress	Kim So-eun	Won
2009	KBS Drama Awards	Best Young Actress	Park Eun-bin	Won
2009	KBS Drama Awards	Best Couple Award	Kim Hyeong-min and Lee Eun-jung	Nominated
2009	KBS Drama Awards	Best Couple Award	Kim Ho-jin and Shin Ae	Nominated
