= Ch'oe Sŭng-no =

Goryeo scholar-official (927–989)

- 최승로

Chancellor of Goryeo
- In office 1 February 988 – 17 June 989
- Monarch: King Seongjong of Goryeo

Personal details
- Born: 927 Geumseong, Silla
- Died: 17 June 989 (aged 63) Gaegyeong, Goryeo
- Children: Ch'oe Suk
- Parent: Ch'oe Ŭn-ham (father)
- Relatives: Ch'oe Ch'i-wŏn (great-grandfather)
- Occupation: Politician; Confucian scholar; Poet; Civil servant; Literary writer

- Ch'oe Sŭng-no
- Hangul: 최승로
- Hanja: 崔承老
- RR: Choe Seungro
- MR: Ch'oe Sŭngno

Posthumous name
- Hangul: 문정
- Hanja: 文貞
- RR: Munjeong
- MR: Munjŏng

Ch'oe Sŭng-no (Korean: 최승로; Hanja: 崔承老; 927 – 17 June 989 was a politician, Confucian scholar, poet, and literary writer in the early Goryeo dynasty. He came from the Gyeongju Choe clan, one of the third class noble families of Silla. He was famous for proposing 28 policies to King Seongjong, most of which were accepted and a became an important basis for state affairs such as Goryeo's political system and local government.

== Life ==
Ch'oe Sŭng-no was born in Gyeongju. He was the son of Silla noble Ch'oe Ŭn-ham, a member of the head rank six class. At age of 12, he had been highly praised by Taejo of Goryeo after reading the Analects in front of the royal court. Due to impressing the king, he was made a student of the Wŏnbongsŏng (원봉성학생; 元鳳省學生). In 982, Ch'oe submitted a memorial to King Seongjong, where he discussed the state policies of previous five kings of Goryeo and proposed 28 policies to reform the government. Later that year, Ch'oe was promoted to the office of Vice-Director of the Chancellery (문하시랑평장사; 門下侍郎平章事; munhasirang p'yŏngjangsa). He spread Confucianism widely in Korea and set up the basic political structure of Goryeo at the era of Seongjong. Seongjong installed 12 provincial capitals and 3 small capitals which were Seoul, Gyeongju and Pyongyang.

In 988, he was promoted to Chancellor (문하시중; 門下侍中; munha sijung), and enfeoffed as marquis of Chungha. He died in 989, and was posthumously named as Munch'ŏng. In 998, he would also be posthumously promoted to Grand Preceptor.

== Poetry ==
He composed "a significant corpus of poems".

== In popular culture ==
- Portrayed by Lee Ji-hyung in the 2002–2003 KBS1 TV series The Dawn of the Empire.
- Portrayed by Lee Ki-yul in the 2009 KBS2 TV series Empress Cheonchu

== See also ==
- Goryeo
- Seongjong of Goryeo

== Cited works ==
- Mair, Victor H. (ed.) (2001). The Columbia History of Chinese Literature. New York: Columbia University Press. ISBN 0-231-10984-9. (Amazon Kindle edition.)
