= Yoo Jin-ryong =

South Korean politician (born 1956)

- 우진룡
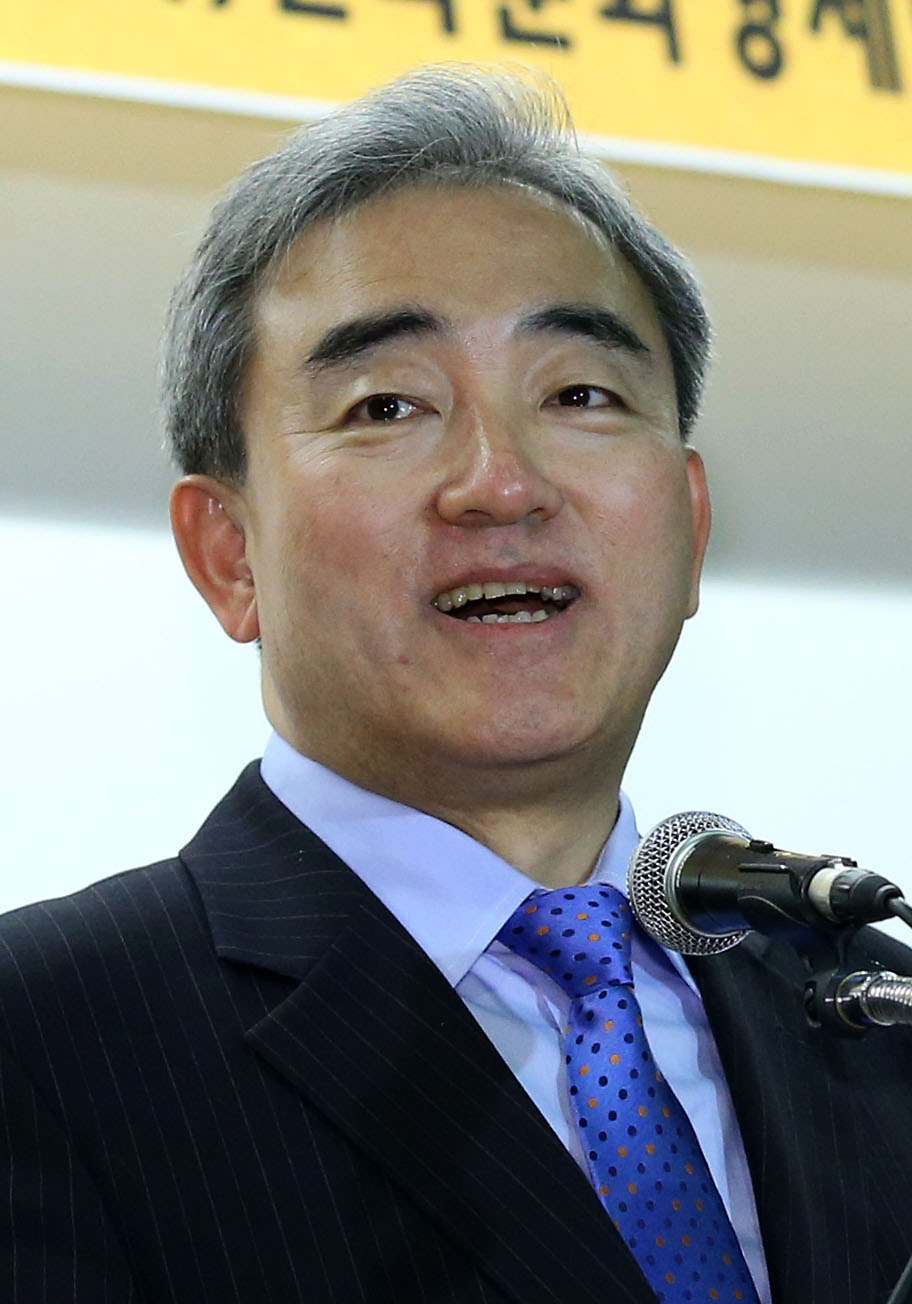
- Born: 1956 (age 69–70)
- Education: Hanyang University

Korean name
- Hangul: 유진룡
- Hanja: 劉震龍
- RR: Yu Jinryong
- MR: Yu Chillyong

Yoo Jin-ryong (Korean: 유진룡) is a South Korean politician who formerly served as the Minister of Culture, Sports and Tourism.

== Life and career ==
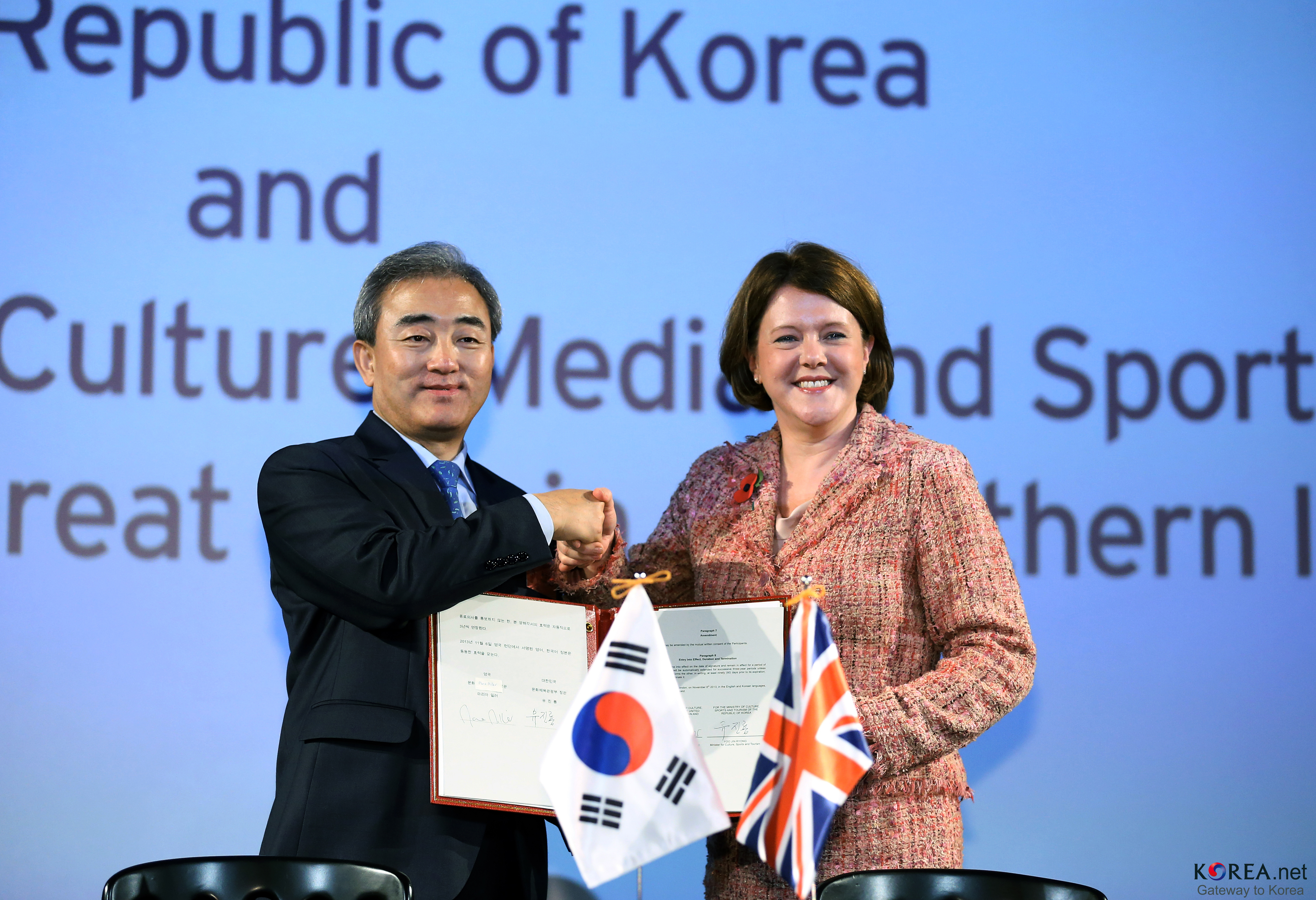
Yu at the London Korean Film Festival

Yoo Jin-ryong was born on September 2, 1956, in Incheon. In 1979, he graduated from Seoul National University with a bachelor's degree in Commerce and Trade, followed by a master's degree in Public Administration from Hanyang University a few years later.

On February 13, 2013, Yoo Jin Ryong was appointed as South Korea's Minister of Culture. Yoo resigned from the post in July 2014 after he clashed with President Park over staffing issues.
