= Jeongju Yu clan =

Korean clan from Kaesong

Chŏngju Yu clan
- Country: Korea
- Origin: Kaepung, Kaesong, North Korea
- Founder: Yu Chon-gung
- Members: 1985: 129 peoples from the 29 household.; 2000: 679 peoples from the 217 household.
- Connected members: Queen Sinhye; Queen Jeongdeok; Queen Myeongui; Yu Seok; Yu Hong; Yu In-jeo; Yu Ja-yu

Korean name
- Hangul: 정주 유씨
- Hanja: 貞州 柳氏
- RR: Jeongju Yussi
- MR: Chŏngju Yussi

The Chŏngju Yu clan (Korean: 정주 유씨; Hanja: 貞州 柳氏) is a Korean clan. Their bongwan (place of origin) is Chŏngju, in modern-day Kaepung, Kaesong, North Korea. It was founded by Yu Chon-gung who was a nobleman from Chŏngju and served as one of the Three Major Grand Masters (태위 삼중대광; 太尉 三重大匡).

== History ==
Wang Kon first met the future Queen Sinhye in Chŏngju while he was still serving under Taebong's monarch, Kung Ye. When four of Kung Ye's generals suggested Wang to rebel against Gung, Queen Sinhye's family, actively persuaded Wang to overthrew Kung Ye.

A prominent ancestor (jungsijo) who made the family prosperous was Yu So (유소; 柳韶) become a Jeonjungsieosa (전중시어사; 殿中侍御史) in 1011, Eosajapdan (어사잡단; 御史雜端) in 1016, Saheonjungseung (사헌중승; 司憲中丞) in 1019, and Ganuidaebu (간의대부; 諫議大夫) in 1022, also Taejabingaek (태자빈객; 太子賓客).

=== Goryeo Queen Consorts ===
==== Agnatic descent ====
- Chŏngju Yu produced the three-queens consorts of Goryeo, they were:
  - Queen Sinhye, King Taejo's first wife.
  - Queen Jeongdeok, King Taejo's sixth wife
  - Queen Myeongui, King Sukjong's only wife.

==== Adopted Chŏngju Yu clan ====
- Queen Munhye, King Munwon's only wife.
- Queen Seonui, King Daejong's only wife.

== See also ==
- Yoo (Korean surname)
