= Yeongcheon Hwangbo clan =

Korean clan from North Gyeongsang Province

- Country: Korea
- Current region: Yeongcheon
- Founder: Hwangbo Neungjang
- Connected members: Hwangbo; Hwangbo Kwan; Hwangbo In
- Website: https://hwangbo.kr/

Yeongcheon Hwangbo clan (Korean: 영천 황보씨; Hanja: 永川 皇甫氏) is one of the Korean clans. Their Bon-gwan is in Yeongcheon, North Gyeongsang Province. According to the research held in 2015, the number of Yeongcheon Hwangbo clan’s member was 10001. Hwangbo clan in Korea began when Hwangbo gyeong (Hanja: 皇甫鏡) was naturalized in Silla from Tang dynasty. Their founder was Hwangbo Neungjang who was a Hwangbo gyeong (Hanja: 皇甫鏡)’s great-grandchild. Hwangbo Neungjang supported Taejo of Goryeo and made a contribution to the unification of three Koreas. He became four-star rank and Prince of Yeongcheon. Then he made Yeongcheon, Yeongcheon Hwangbo clan’s Bon-gwan and officially began Yeongcheon Hwangbo clan.

== See also ==
- Korean clan names of foreign origin
