= Hwangbo In =

Korean politician (1387–1453)

Hwangbo In 황보인

Chief State Councillor
- In office 20 November 1451 – 10 November 1453
- Preceded by: Ha Yeon
- Succeeded by: Yi Yu, Grand Prince Suyang

Left State Councillor
- In office 21 October 1449 – 20 November 1451
- Preceded by: Ha Yeon
- Succeeded by: Nam Ji

Right State Councillor
- In office 22 July 1447 – 21 October 1449
- Preceded by: Ha Yeon
- Succeeded by: Nam Ji

Personal details
- Born: 1387
- Died: 10 November 1453 (aged 65–66) Hanseong, Joseon

Korean name
- Hangul: 황보인
- Hanja: 皇甫仁
- RR: Hwangbo In
- MR: Hwangbo In

Art name
- Hangul: 지봉
- Hanja: 芝峰
- RR: Jibong
- MR: Chibong

Courtesy name
- Hangul: 사겸
- Hanja: 四兼
- RR: Sagyeom
- MR: Sagyŏm

Hwangbo In (1387–10 November 1453) was a Joseon Dynasty politician who was Chief State Councillor from 1450 to 1453 during the era of King Munjong and King Danjong. As the King Danjong was 12 years old when the latter succeeded as King, Hwangbo In and his ally, Left State Councillor or Vice Prime Minister, General Kim Chongsŏ extended their powers during the court and so, Grand Prince Suyang produced a coup d'état and killed Hwangbo In, Kim Chongsŏ and their allies.

== Family ==
- Father - Hwangbo Rim (황보림; 皇甫琳; 1333–1394)
  - Grandfather - Hwangbo Ahn (황보안; 皇甫安)
- Mother - Lady Ahn of the Tamjin Ahn clan (탐진 안씨; 耽津 安氏)
  - Grandfather - Ahn Woo (안우; 安祐; ? – 1362)
- Sibling(s)
  - Older brother - Hwangbo Jeon (황보전; 皇甫琠)
- Wives and children
  - Lady Yi of the Yangseong Yi clan (양성 이씨; 陽城 李氏)
    - Son - Hwangbo Seok (황보석)
    - Son - Hwangbo Eun (황보은)
    - Son - Hwangbo Heum (황보흠)
    - Daughter - Lady Hwangbo of the Yeongcheon Hwangbo clan (영천 황보씨; 永川 皇甫氏)
      - Son-in-law - Kim Man-seo (김만서; 金晩緖) from the Sacheon Kim clan
    - Daughter - Lady Hwangbo of the Yeongcheon Hwangbo clan (영천 황보씨; 永川 皇甫氏)
      - Son-in-law - Hong Won-suk (홍원숙; 洪元淑) from the Namyang Hong clan
    - Daughter - Lady Hwangbo of the Yeongcheon Hwangbo clan (영천 황보씨; 永川 皇甫氏)
      - Son-in-law - Yun Dang (윤당; 尹塘)
    - Daughter - Lady Hwangbo of the Yeongcheon Hwangbo clan (영천 황보씨; 永川 皇甫氏)
      - Son-in-law - Kwon Eun (권은; 權訔)

== Popular culture ==
- Portrayed by Shim Yang-ho in the 2011 JTBC TV series Insu, The Queen Mother.
- Portrayed by Lee Chang-jik in 2013 film The Face Reader.
