= Kang Cho =

Goryeo scholar-official (964–1010)

- Born: 964; Sinchon, Seohae-do Goryeo
- Died: January 1, 1011 (aged about 47); Liaoyang, Liao dynasty
- Children: Lady Kang (daughter)
- Military career
- Service years: Goryeo Army (?–1010)
- Conflicts: Goryeo-Khitan War

Korean name
- Hangul: 강조
- Hanja: 康兆
- RR: Gang Jo
- MR: Kang Cho

Childhood name
- Hangul: 진형
- Hanja: 進刑
- RR: Jinhyeong
- MR: Chinhyŏng

Kang Cho (Korean: 강조; Hanja: 康兆, 964 – January 1, 1011 (Note: In the Korean calendar (lunisolar), he died on 24th day of the 11th lunar month in 1010.)) was a Goryeo official, who served under King Mokjong of Goryeo and King Hyeonjong of Goryeo. He was the military inspector of Seobukmyeon, the northwest frontier territory on Goryeo's border with the Liao dynasty. He seized power and overthrew Mokjong and installed Hyeonjong as king in his place. When the Liao invaded Goryeo, he was defeated in battle, captured, and then killed.

== Rise to power ==
Kang Cho was the military inspector (도순검사; 都巡檢使; tosun kŏmsa) of Seobukmyeon. On February 13, 1009, a large fire broke out in the palace and King Mokjong suffered from shock and became ill. Kim Ch'i-yang, the lover of the king's mother Queen Dowager Cheonchu, attempted to place their son as the heir and kill Prince Daeryangwon (the later King Hyeonjong), who was a rival claimant to be the royal heir. King Mokjong called Kang Cho to the capital city of Kaesong with his army in order to stop Kim. Kang brought a force of 5000 men to the capital and executed Kim Ch'i-yang and his supporters. However, Kang Cho also killed King Mokjong, and exiled Queen Dowager Cheonchu.

After assassinating King Mokjong, Kang placed King Hyeonjong of Goryeo on the throne. Kang merged the Security Council (중추원; 中樞院; Chungch'uwŏn), the Office of Transmission (은대; 銀臺; ŭndae), and the Institute of Palace Miscellaneousness (선휘원; 宣徽院; Sŏnhwiwŏn) into the newly formed Palace Secretariat (중대성; 中臺省; chungdaesŏng). Kang appointed himself as the chungdaesa (중대사; 中臺使; chungdaesa), or head of the Palace Secretariat.

== War with the Liao and death ==
Soon after this, Emperor Shengzong of Liao attacked Goryeo during the fall of 1010, under the pretext that Kang Cho had committed regicide. The newly installed King Hyeonjong gave Kang 300,000 men under his command to stop the Khitan invaders. According to the Goryeosa, a 400,000-man Liao army invaded Goryeo territory. Liao first attacked but failed to capture the fort of Heunghwa-jin, whose defender was General Yang Kyu.

Next, the Liao finally headed to the city of Tongju, which is where Kang Cho and 300,000 Goryeo troops were waiting. Kang Cho set up an ambush on a narrow pass that the Liao army was inevitably going to have to pass. There, he directly led his troops in a three-pronged attack when the Liao came. The Liao soldiers were forced to retreat and 10,000 died during this ambush. The enemy troops again attacked Tongju but faced a humiliating defeat with severe casualties.

The Liao commander launched another attack on the city, with Kang Cho as his main target. The Liao were defeated a third time, and were forced to retreat once more. In one last-ditch effort, the Liao army came attacking once more, but this time, Kang Cho did not directly orchestrate the attack and played baduk with one of his lieutenants instead, thinking that victory was a given. In the same time, Liao general Yelü Pennu led the Khitan army to attack and capture Samsu (삼수; 三水). However, Kang Cho did not take any measures to defend against the Khitans. Then one of Kang Cho's men told his plan to the Liao. Liao soldiers pierced through the city's defenses. After the Khitan army launched a surprise attack, the Goryeo army was defeated, finally 30,000 Goryeo soldiers were killed and Kang Cho was captured. Emperor Shengzong sought to convince Kang Cho to defect to the Khitans and serve him. Kang refused to surrender even under torture to the emperor, who in turn executed Kang.

== Place in history and comparison to Yŏn Kaesomun ==
Kang Cho is seen as a hero. Though his rule was a time of war against the invading Liao, not many deaths were ordered by the general with the exception of King Mokjong and the conspiring scholar-officials. Kang Cho can be compared with his predecessor Yŏn Kaesomun of Goguryeo, who had also killed a King of Goguryeo for conspiring against him.

Kang, however, was not as brilliant as Yŏn Kaesomun, as he was not able to keep control for very long. Kang Cho did bring great victories to Goryeo over the Liao dynasty, but his death brought about another period of trouble for Goryeo, just as Yŏn Kaesomun's death had done to Goguryeo. Kang Cho can be seen as a smaller-scale version of Yŏn Kaesomun.

== Family ==
- Father: Kang Tae-ju (강태주; 康泰周)
- Daughter: Lady Kang (부인 강씨; 夫人 康氏)
  - Son-in-law: Kim Chin-yu (김진유; 金振酉)

== In popular culture ==
- Portrayed by Choi Jae-sung in the 2009 KBS2 TV series Empress Cheonchu.
- Portrayed by Lee Won-jong in the 2023 KBS2 TV series Korea–Khitan War.

== See also ==
- Goryeo
