= Queen Sinjeong (Goryeo) =

Queen dowager of Goryeo (died 983)

Queen Sinjeong 신정왕후

Queen dowager of Goryeo
- Tenure: 981–983
- Coronation: 981
- Predecessor: Queen Dowager Sinmyeong
- Successor: Queen Dowager Heonae
- Monarch: King Seongjong (grandson)
- Born: c.900 Hwangju, North Hwanghae Province
- Died: 19 August 983 (aged about 80); Goryeo
- Burial: Sureung tomb
- Spouse: Taejo of Goryeo
- Issue: Daejong of Goryeo; Queen Daemok
Regnal name
- Lady Hwangjuwon (황주원부인; 黃州院夫人); Grand Lady Myeongbok (명복궁대부인; 明福宮大夫人); Grand Queen Mother Sinjeong (신정왕태후; 神靜王太后); Grand Royal Queen Mother Sinjeong (신정대왕태후; 神靜大王太后)
Posthumous name
- Grand Royal Queen Mother Jeongheon Uigyeong Seondeok Jagyeong Sinjeong 정헌의경선덕자경신정대왕태후 (定憲懿敬宣德慈景神靜大王太后)
- House: Hwangju Hwangbo (by birth); House of Wang (by marriage)
- Father: Hwangbo Je-gong (황보제공)

Queen Sinjeong of the Hwangju Hwangbo clan (Korean: 신정왕후 황보씨; Hanja: 神靜王后 皇甫氏; d. 19 August 983 (Note: In the Korean calendar (lunisolar), she died on 9th day, 7th month, 983: 《고려사》권3 〈세가〉권3 - 성종 2년 7월 기사; 고려시대 史料 Database. db.history.go.kr (in Chinese).)) was the fourth wife of Taejo of Goryeo who became the mother of Daejong of Goryeo and Queen Daemok. All of the Goryeo kings after Gyeongjong were her descendants.

== Biography ==
=== Early life ===
The future Queen Sinjeong was born as the daughter of Hwangbo Je-gong, Duke Chungui (황보제공 충의공) who was one of the Three Major Grand Masters (태위 삼중대광; 太尉 三重大匡) from Hwangju, North Hwanghae Province.

=== Marriage and palace life ===
She married Wang Geon (왕건) as his second wife after he ascended the throne as the first King of Goryeo. Since at that time he already had a Queen, Hwangbo initially became a Royal consort and was given the royal title of Lady Hwangjuwon (황주원부인; 黃州院夫人; lit. 'Lady of the Hwangju Courtyard'). Together, they had a son who would become the father of King Seongjong and a daughter who later became the first wife of King Gwangjong. One of Geon's grandson, King Gyeongjong honoured her as Grand Lady Myeongbok (명복궁대부인; 明福宮大夫人) and ordered her to live in Myeongbok Palace (명복궁; 明福宮).

=== Later life ===
She outlived her husband by 40 years and died at about 80 years old. Since her only son and his wife died young, all of their children were raised by Queen Sinjeong and she devoted her entire affection to them. It as said that Queen Sinjeong had a virtuous personality and was respected by the officials for being frugal and wise.

After her death on 19 August 983, she was promoted from a Royal consort's position into Queen Mother Sinjeong (신정왕태후; 神靜王太后) and was buried in Sureung tomb; she also received a posthumous name.

=== Posthumous name ===
- In April 1002 (5th year reign of King Mokjong), name Jeong-heon (정헌; 定憲) was added.
- In March 1014 (5th year reign of King Hyeonjong), name Ui-gyeong (의경; 懿敬) was added.
- In April 1027 (18th year reign of King Hyeonjong), name Seon-deok (선덕; 宣德) was added.
- In October 1056 (10th year reign of King Munjong), name Ja-gyeong (자경; 慈景) was added.

== In popular culture ==
- Portrayed by Ahn Hae-sook in the 2002–2003 KBS TV series The Dawn of the Empire.
- Portrayed by Ban Hyo-jung in the 2009 KBS2 TV series Empress Cheonchu.
- Portrayed by Jung Kyung-soon in the 2016 SBS TV series Moon Lovers: Scarlet Heart Ryeo.
