= Gyeongjong of Goryeo =

King of Goryeo from 975 to 981

Gyeongjong

King of Goryeo
- Reign: 975–981
- Coronation: 975; Kaegyŏng, Goryeo
- Predecessor: Gwangjong
- Successor: Seongjong
- Born: Wang Ju; 9 November 955; Kaegyŏng, Goryeo
- Died: 13 August 981 (aged 26); Kaegyŏng, Goryeo
- Burial: Yeongneung (영릉; 榮陵)
- Queen Consort: Queen Heonsuk; Queen Heonui; Queen Heonae; Queen Heonjeong
- Consort: Lady Daemyeong
- Son: Mokjong
Era name and dates
- Taepyeong (태평; 太平): 976–981
Posthumous name
- Great King Jiin Seongmok Myeonghye Heonhwa (지인성목명혜헌화대왕, 至仁成穆明惠獻和大王; original); Great King Gongui Jeonghyo Sunhui Myeonghye Seongmok Heonhwa (공의정효순희명혜성목헌화대왕, 恭懿靖孝順熙明惠成穆獻和大王; final)
Temple name
- Gyeongjong (경종; 景宗)
- House: Wang
- Dynasty: Goryeo
- Father: Gwangjong
- Mother: Queen Daemok

Korean name
- Hangul: 왕주
- Hanja: 王伷
- RR: Wang Ju
- MR: Wang Chu

Monarch name
- Hangul: 경종
- Hanja: 景宗
- RR: Gyeongjong
- MR: Kyŏngjong

Courtesy name
- Hangul: 장민
- Hanja: 長民
- RR: Jangmin
- MR: Changmin

Posthumous name
- Hangul: 헌화대왕
- Hanja: 獻和大王
- RR: Heonhwa daewang
- MR: Hŏnhwa taewang

Gyeongjong (9 November 955 – 13 August 981), personal name Wang Chu, was the fifth ruler of the Goryeo dynasty of Korea. He was the eldest son of King Gwangjong, and was confirmed as Crown Prince in the year of his birth. He was also the maternal and paternal grandson of King Taejo.

Upon rising to the throne, Gyeongjong established the Jeonsigwa (田柴科, land-allotment system) which established the economic basis for Goryeo's bureaucracy. Following his ascension, he issued pardons for those whom his predecessor had persecuted and even reinstated their titles. Later, according to the Goryeo-sa, he avoided politics and royalty, and spent his time cavorting with commoners as well as indulging in sex or playing baduk.

== Family ==
- Father: Gwangjong of Goryeo (광종; 925–4 July 975)
  - Grandfather: Taejo of Goryeo (태조; 31 January 877–4 July 943)
  - Grandmother: Queen Sinmyeong of the Chungju Yu clan (신명왕후 유씨)
- Mother: Queen Daemok of the Hwangju Hwangbo clan (대목왕후 황보씨; 925–?)
  - Grandfather: Taejo of Goryeo (태조; 31 January 877–4 July 943)
  - Grandmother: Queen Sinjeong of the Hwangju Hwangbo clan (신정왕후 황보씨; ?—19 August 983)
- Consorts and their Respective Issue(s):
1. Queen Heonsuk of the Gyeongju Kim clan (헌숙왕후 김씨; 937–?); first cousin – No issue.
2. Queen Heonui of the Chungju Yu clan (헌의왕후 유씨); first cousin – No issue.
3. Queen Heonae of the Hwangju Hwangbo clan (헌애왕후 황보씨; 964–20 January 1029); half first cousin.
  1. Wang Song, Prince Gaeryeong (목종; 5 July 980–2 March 1009), 1st son
4. Queen Heonjeong of the Hwangju Hwangbo clan (헌정왕후 황보씨; 966–993); half first cousin – No issue.
5. Lady Daemyeong of the Chungju Yu clan (대명궁부인 유씨); half first cousin – No issue.

== In popular culture ==
- Portrayed by Kim Min-woo in the 2002–2003 KBS TV series The Dawn of the Empire.
- Portrayed by Choi Cheol-ho in the 2009 KBS2 TV series Empress Cheonchu.

== See also ==
- List of Goryeo people
- List of Korean rulers

Gyeongjong of Goryeo House of Wang Born: 9 November 955 Died: 13 August 981
Regnal titles
| Preceded by Gwangjong | King of Goryeo; 975–981 | Succeeded by Seongjong |
