= Mokjong of Goryeo =

King of Goryeo from 997 to 1009

Mokjong 목종 穆宗

King of Goryeo
- Reign: 997 – 2 March 1009
- Coronation: 997; Gaegyeong, Goryeo
- Predecessor: Seongjong of Goryeo
- Successor: Hyeonjong of Goryeo
- Born: Wang Song; 5 July 980; Gaegyeong, Goryeo
- Died: 2 March 1009 (aged 28); Jeokseong-hyeon, Gaeseong-bu, Gaegyeong, Goryeo
- Burial: Gongneung (공릉; 恭陵) → Uireung (의릉; 義陵)
- Queen Consort: Queen Seonjeong
- Concubine: Lady Yoseok
Posthumous name
- Great King Hyosa Wihye Geukyeong Jeonggong Seonyang 효사위혜극영정공선양대왕 (孝思威惠克英定恭宣讓大王)
Temple name
- Minjong (민종; 愍宗) → Mokjong (목종; 穆宗)
- House: Wang
- Dynasty: Goryeo
- Father: Gyeongjong of Goryeo
- Mother: Queen Heonae

- Korean name
- Hangul: 왕송
- Hanja: 王訟
- RR: Wang Song
- MR: Wang Song

Monarch name
- Hangul: 목종
- Hanja: 穆宗
- RR: Mokjong
- MR: Mokchong

Courtesy name
- Hangul: 효신
- Hanja: 孝伸
- RR: Hyosin
- MR: Hyosin

Posthumous name
- Hangul: 선양대왕
- Hanja: 宣讓大王
- RR: Seonyang daewang
- MR: Sŏnyang taewang

Mokjong (5 July 980 – 2 March 1009), personal name Wang Song, was the seventh ruler of the Goryeo dynasty of Korea.

== Reign ==
Born as Wang Song, Mokjong was the only son of King Gyeongjong; however, when his father died, he was too young to become king, so it was his uncle, prince Gaeryeong Wang Ch'i, who succeeded to the throne as King Seongjong. Mokjong eventually became king after his uncle's death in 997 and chose his mother, Queen Honae, as regent.

Mokjong is known for his reform of the Jeonsigwa (land-allotment system) as well as his various efforts to reorganize the military system and rebuild Pyongyang's castle to strengthen Goryeo's northern defenses early in his reign. He is also remembered for a plot by his mother, Queen Honae and her lover Kim Ch'i-yang to overthrow him. Queen Honae and Kim sought to replace Mokjong with their child, whom they had presented as a son of Mokjong's father, Gyeongjong of Goryeo, which Mokjong sought to prevent as it would have meant the end of the House of Wang's rule over Goryeo. Further complicating the situation was Mokjong's homosexuality, which led to his lack of heirs, and his sexuality would be used as an excuse for his eventual overthrow. Mokjong called in General Kang to stop Queen Honae and Kim's coup, but in the process, Mokjong himself was dethroned by general Kang Cho on charges that he had neglected the defense of the country which was in imminent danger from an invasion by the Khitan Liao as well as allegations that his homosexuality was a "sickness" and was forcefully sent into exile in Chungju. However, he was slain before he arrived there.

Mokjong's tomb was known as Gongneung, but its present location is not known.

== Family ==
- Father: Gyeongjong of Goryeo
  - Grandfather: Gwangjong of Goryeo
  - Grandmother: Queen Daemok of the Hwangju Hwangbo clan
- Mother: Queen Heonae of the Hwangju Hwangbo clan
  - Grandfather: Daejong of Goryeo
  - Grandmother: Queen Seonui of the Chŏngju Yu clan
- Consorts and their respective Issue(s):
1. Queen Seonjeong of the Chungju Yu clan; maternal first cousin or paternal second cousin – No issue.
2. Palace Lady Yoseoktaek, of the Kim clan (요석택궁인 김씨) – No issue.

== In popular culture ==
- Portrayed by Lee In in the 2009 KBS2 TV series Empress Cheonchu.
- Portrayed by Baek Sung-hyun in the 2023 KBS2 TV series Korea–Khitan War.

== See also ==
- List of Korean monarchs
- List of Goryeo people
- Kang Cho

Mokjong of Goryeo House of Wang Born: 5 July 980 Died: 2 March 1009
Regnal titles
Preceded by Seongjong	King of Goryeo; 997–1009	Succeeded by Hyeonjong
