= Pak Yŏnggyu =

Korean general (fl. 10th century)

- Born: Unknown; Silla
- Died: Unknown; Goryeo
- Spouse: Lady Kyŏn Aebok
- Children: 2 unnamed sons Lady Dongsanwon; Queen Mungong; Queen Munseong
- Father: Pak Ŏn-ji, Grand Prince Gangnam (박언지 강남대군)

Korean name
- Hangul: 박영규
- Hanja: 朴英規
- RR: Bak Yeonggyu
- MR: Pak Yŏnggyu

Pak Yŏnggyu (Korean: 박영규; Hanja: 朴英規) was a Korean general who served Later Paekche. He was the son-in-law of its king, having married Kyŏn Hwŏn's daughter. When Kyŏn Hwŏn escaped to the rival kingdom of Goryeo after being overthrown by his son, Pak also defected to Goryeo. Pak was the father of Lady Dongsanwon, Queen Mungong, and Queen Munseong.

== Biography ==
In March 935, Pak Yŏnggyu's father-in-law, Kyŏn Hwŏn was overthrown in a palace coup and imprisoned at Geumsansa Temple (금산사; 金山寺) by his oldest son, Kyŏn Sin'gŏm, then in June, Kyŏn Hwŏn escaped and fled to Goryeo. In September 936, after secretly discussing and consulting with his wife, Princess Kyŏn Aebok, Pak sent an envoy to Goryeo to express his intention to defect and said that he would welcome the Goryeo army. Goryeo's king, Wang Kŏn, then rejoiced greatly about this and treated that messenger generously and sent him back to Pak. Later, when Wang Kŏn finally won in attacked the Later Paekche, Pak helped to contribute to the unification of Later Three Kingdoms.

After this, Wang Kŏn rewarded Pak Yonggyu with land of an area of 1,000 kyŏng (경; 頃). Wang Kŏn also granted Pak's wife with 35 horses (역마 35필) and gave their two sons government posts. Due to Pak's contribution in helping Wang establish the new Goryeo Dynasty, Pak became officially titled as one of the Threefold Great Rectifers (삼중대광; 三重大匡; samjungdaegwang), along with Yu Ch'ŏn'gung and Hwangbo Che-gong.

Since Pak was the one of Threefold Great Rectifers, both him and his wife had a good relationship with Taejo of Goryeo, they regarded and treated each other like siblings. Because of this too, Pak's oldest daughter became 17th wife of Taejo and his other two daughters became the first and second wives of Taejo's son, Jeongjong of Goryeo.

== Family ==
1. Wife: Princess Kyŏn Aebok
  1. Mr. Pak (박씨) – 1st son.
  2. Mr. Pak (박씨) – 2nd son.
  3. Lady Dongsanwon – 1st daughter.
  4. Queen Mungong – 2nd daughter.
  5. Queen Munseong – 3rd daughter.

== In popular culture ==
- Portrayed by Im Hyuk-joo in the 2000–2002 KBS1 TV series Taejo Wang Geon.
- Portrayed by Kim Sang-soon in the 2002–2003 KBS TV series The Dawn of the Empire.
- Portrayed by Choi Byung-mo in the 2016 SBS TV series Moon Lovers: Scarlet Heart Ryeo.

== See also ==
- Yu Ch'ŏn-gung
- Hwangbo Che-gong
