= Wang Ponggyu =

Korean nobleman (fl. 10th century)

- Hangul: 왕봉규
- Hanja: 王逢規
- RR: Wang Bonggyu
- MR: Wang Ponggyu

Wang Ponggyu (Korean: 왕봉규; Hanja: 王逢規) was a Korean hojok, or local aristocratic lord, of Gangju (modern-day Jinju). He lived during the Later Three Kingdoms period.

== Biography ==
Wang was a Korean hojok known for his maritime influence. Originally from Cheonju (modern-day Uiryeong, South Korea), Wang expanded his control to Jinju and styled himself as the military governor of Cheonju (천주절도사; 泉州節度使; Ch'ŏnju chŏltosa). Wang conducted independent diplomacy with China, sending envoys to the Later Tang in 924 and 927. In 927, he was given the title of Huaihua da jiangjun (懷化大將軍), or civilizing general, by the Later Tang. Wang's maritime trade routes connected his port in Hadong to China, passing through the Later Baekje-controlled territories of Goheung and Yeosu, suggesting that Wang was aligned with Kyŏn Hwŏn's Later Baekje. After the Goryeo navy led by Yŏngch'ang and Nŭngsik attacked the Gangju region in 927, there were no more records of Wang Ponggyu.
