= Kyŏn Aebok =

- Grand Lady Kyŏn of the Three Han State
- Born: Unknown; Later Baekje
- Died: Unknown
- Spouse: Pak Yŏnggyu
- Issue: 2 sons and 3 daughters
Regnal name
- Lady Kyon; Grand Lady Kyon
- House: Hwanggan Kyŏn
- Father: Kyŏn Hwŏn
- Religion: Buddhism

Korean name
- Hangul: 견애복
- Hanja: 甄哀福
- RR: Gyeon Aebok
- MR: Kyŏn Aebok

Royal title
- Hangul: 삼한국대부인 견씨
- Hanja: 三韓國大夫人 甄氏
- RR: Samhangukdaebuin Gyeonssi
- MR: Samhan'guktaebuin Kyŏnssi

Kyŏn Aebok (Korean: 견애복; Hanja: 甄哀福; fl. 10th century), often referred as Lady Kyŏn in some historical sources, was the daughter of Kyŏn Hwŏn and wife of Pak Yŏnggyu. The couple had a good-relationship with Wang Kŏn since Wang regarded Pak as his older brother. Due to this, their eldest daughter became one of Wang's wives and their other daughters became Wang's third son's wives. These daughters were later known posthumously as Lady Dongsanwon, Queen Mungong, and Queen Munseong.

== Family ==
- Father: Kyŏn Hwŏn (867–936)
  - Grandfather: Ajagae
  - Grandmother: Lady Sangwŏn (상원부인)
- Mother: Lady Gobi of the Suncheon Pak clan (고비녀 순천 박씨)
  - Older brother: Kyŏn Nŭngye (견능예)
- Husband: Pak Yŏnggyu
1. Mr. Pak (박씨) – 1st son.
2. Mr. Pak (박씨) – 2nd son.
3. Lady Dongsanwon – 1st daughter
4. Queen Mungong – 2nd daughter
5. Queen Munseong – 3rd daughter

== In popular culture ==
- Portrayed by Im Kyung-ok in the 2000–2002 KBS1 TV series Taejo Wang Geon.
