= Zhen (surname) =

- Zhen surname in regular script
- Pronunciation: Zhēn (Pinyin); Chin (Pe̍h-ōe-jī)
- Language: Chinese, Vietnamese, Korean

Origin
- Language: Old Chinese

Other names
- Variant forms: Zhen, Chen(Mandarin); Yan, Yen (Cantonese); Chin (Hokkien); Gyeon (Korean); Chân (Vietnamese)
- Derivative: Gyeon

Zhen (Chinese: 甄; pinyin: Zhēn; Wade–Giles: Chen; Cantonese Yale: Yan^{1}), is a Chinese family name that takes the 205th place in the Hundred Family Surnames. The Chinese character for Zhen is the same in traditional and simplified characters. It is usually romanised as Yan or Yen in Cantonese (commonly used in Hong Kong).

== Notable people with the surname Zhen ==
- Lady Zhen (甄夫人; 183–221), personal name unknown, first wife of Cao Pi
- Zhen Luan (甄鸾; 535–566), mathematician of the Southern and Northern dynasties period
- Zhen Bin (甄彬), served as an official of Pi County during the Liang dynasty, known for his honesty when he returned five pieces of gold that he took by mistake
- Zhen Chen (甄琛), Northern Wei official, known for his incorruptible character
- Zhen Quan (甄权; c. 541–643), Tang dynasty medical practitioner
- Zhen Lixin (甄立言), Tang dynasty medical practitioner, Zhen Quan's younger brother
- Martin Yan (甄文达; Zhen Wenda; b. 1948), China-born American celebrity chef
- Chen Chen (甄珍; Zhen Zhen; b. 1948), Taiwanese actress
- Jenny Tseng (b. 1953), known by her Cantonese stage name Yan Nei (甄妮; Zhen Ni), Hong Kong singer
- Donnie Yen (甄子丹; Zhen Zidan; b. 1963), Hong Kong actor and martial artist
- Yolinda Yan (甄楚倩; Zhen Chuqian; b. 1969), Hong Kong actress and singer
- Jim Yan (甄子康; Zhen Zikang; b. 1977), Hong Kong DJ
- Carisa Yan (甄颖珊; Zhen Yingshan; b. 1980), Hong Kong actress, model and singer
- Chris Yen (甄子菁; Zhen Zijing), Donnie Yen's younger sister, Hong Kong actress and martial artist
- Lawrence Yan (甄志强; Zhen Zhiqiang), Hong Kong actor
- Yan Kin-keung (甄健强; Zhen Jianqiang), Hong Kong lyricist

== See also ==
- Gyeon
