= Lady Dongsanwon =

Royal consort of Goryeo (fl. 10th century)

Lady Dongsanwon 동산원부인

Royal consort of Goryeo
- Predecessor: Lady Sogwangjuwon
- Successor: Lady Yehwa
- Born: ? Suncheon, South Jeolla Province
- Died: ? Suncheon, South Jeolla Province
- Spouse: Taejo of Goryeo
- House: Suncheon Pak clan
- Father: Pak Yŏng-gyu
- Mother: Kyŏn Ae-bok
- Religion: Buddhism

Lady Dongsanwon of the Suncheon Pak clan (Korean: 동산원부인 박씨; Hanja: 東山院夫人 朴氏; lit. 'Lady of the Eastern Mountain Courtyard') was the eldest maternal granddaughter of Kyŏn Hwŏn and daughter of Pak Yŏng-gyu. She became the 18th wife of King Taejo of Goryeo and was the oldest, among Queen Mungong and Queen Munseong who both became Jeongjong's wives.
