= The Dawn of the Empire =

2002–2003 South Korean TV series

- Promotional poster
- Hangul: 제국의 아침
- Hanja: 帝國의 아침
- RR: Jegugui achim
- MR: Chegugŭi ach'im
- Genre: Historical
- Written by: Lee Hwan-kyung
- Directed by: Jun Sung-hong; Kim Hyung-il; Lee Won-ik
- Starring: Kim Sang-joong; Jun Hye-jin; Choi Jae-sung; Hong Ri-na; Kim Min-woo
- Narrated by: Im Jong-gook
- Composer: Kim Dong-sung
- Country of origin: South Korea
- Original language: Korean
- No. of seasons: 1
- No. of episodes: 94

Production
- Producer: Jung Young-chul
- Cinematography: Kim Yong-joon
- Editor: Min Byung-ho
- Running time: 50–60 minutes

Original release
- Network: KBS1
- Release: 2 March 2002 – 26 January 2003

The Dawn of the Empire (Korean: 제국의 아침; RR: Jegugui achim) is a South Korean historical television series which aired on KBS1 from March 2, 2002 to January 26, 2003 for 94 episodes every weekend at 21:45 (KST). It was KBS' second historical series set in Goryeo after Taejo Wang Geon and revolved around the reigns of the second, third and fourth kings of Goryeo, particularly the fourth one, Gwangjong's.

Written by Lee Hwan-kyung, it was the first South Korean drama to be filmed in North Korea, particularly in Pyongyang and Mount Baekdu. Open sets built in Andong, Mungyeong and Jecheon for Taejo Wang Geon were also used.

The drama debuted with a viewership of 31.9%, which later fell to an average of 19.6%, lower than had been expected. Eventually, the broadcaster decided to shorten the series.

== Cast ==
=== Main ===
- Kim Sang-joong as King Gwangjong

4th ruler of Goryeo

- Jun Hye-jin as Queen Daemok

Gwangjong's primary wife, formerly half-sister

- Choi Jae-sung as King Jeongjong

3rd ruler of Goryeo

- Hong Ri-na as Queen Mungong

Jeongjong's 1st wife

- Kim Min-woo as Crown Prince Wang Ju

Gwangjong and Daemok's son

=== Supporting ===
==== Royal household ====
Around Taejo

- Choi Soo-jong and Lee Moon-soo as King Taejo (cameo)
- Ban Hyo-jung as Lady Oh, Queen Janghwa

Taejo's 2nd wife and Hyejong's mother

- Jung Young-sook as Lady Yoo, Queen Sinmyeong

Taejo's 3rd wife, Jeongjong and Gwangjong's mother

- Ahn Hae-sook as Lady Hwangbo, Queen Sinjeong

Taejo's 4th wife, Daejong and Daemok's mother

- Han Bok-hee as Lady Dongyangwon
- Seo Mi-ae as Lady Sogwangwon
- Jung Gook-jin as King Daejong

Daemok's older brother

- Lee Kan-hee as Princess Naknang

Kim Bu's 2nd wife and Taejo's oldest daughter

- Go Dong-hyun as Prince Hyoeun
  - Park Jin-hyung as young Prince Hyoeun
- Kim Gwang-young as Prince Wonnyeong
- Choi Sung-min as Prince Hyoseong

Around Hyejong

- Noh Young-gook as King Hyejong

2nd ruler of Goryeo

- Kim Hyun-joo as Queen Uihwa

Hyejong's primary wife

- Kang Kyung-hun as Lady Hugwangjuwon
- Oh Ji-young as Lady Cheongjuwon
- Kim Min-kyung as Lady Gyeonghwa
  - Jang Han-na as young Lady Gyeonghwa

Hyejong and Uihwa's daughter who become Gwangjong's 2nd wife.

- Kim Gyu-min as Prince Heunghwa
  - Seo Hyun-suk as young Prince Heunghwa

Hyejong and Uihwa's son

Around Jeongjong

- Kim Hyo-joo as Queen Munseong

Mungong's younger sister

- Do Ji-young as Lady Cheongjunamwon

Cheongjuwon's younger sister

- Kim Min-woo as Prince Gyeongchunwon
  - Sung Nak-man as young Prince Gyeongchunwon

Jeongjong and Munseong's only son

==== People in Silla ====
- Lee Do-ryun as Kim Bu, Duke Jungsung

The last ruler of Silla

==== Officials and nobles ====
- Kim Heung-ki as Wang Sik-ryeom, Taejo's cousin and Jeongjong's supporter
- Min-Wook as Wang Yuk
- Jo Kyung-hwan as Park Sul-hee, Hyejong's supporter
- Kim Mu-saeng as Ham Gyu, later Wang Gyu
- Baek In-chul as Yeom Sang
- Kim Sang-soon as Park Yeong-gyu, Mungong and Munseong's father
- Jung Dong-hwan as Choi Ji-mong
- Jung Sang-chul as Park Su-gyeong
- Kim Young-in as Park Su-mun
- Lee Hyo-jung as Shuang Ji (Ssang Gi)
- Lee Ji-hyung as Choi Seung-ro
- Jung Woon-yong as Wang Yung
- Park Seung-gyoo as Shin Gang
- Kwon Hyuk-ho as Kwon Shin
- Han Bum-hee as Seo Hui
- Lee Dae-ro as Seo Pil, Seo Hui's father
- Lee Jae-yun as Lee Mong-yu
- Byun Hee-bong as Kim Geung-ryul
- Kim Soo-il as Yu Cheon-gung
- Heo Hyun-ho as Yu Geung-dal, Queen Sinmyeong's father
- Kim Gi-bok as Hwangbo Sung
- Heo Gi-ho as Kim Yeong
- Choi Hun-chul as Shin Jil
- Jang Gi-yong as Jang Yu
- Choi Sung-joon as Wang Ham-yun
- Park Gyung-deuk as Kang Gi-ju
- Jung-Wook as Ham Soon
- Maeng Bong-hak as So Mu-gae
- Yang Jae-sung as Ssang Cheol
- Yoo Byung-han as Wang Seung
- Kim Sung-ok as Kwon Jik
- Park Jung-woong as Mister Hwangbo
- Park Young-tae as Hwangbo Gwang-gyeom
- Kim Joo-young as Kim Gyeon-sul
- Lee Han-seung as Im Hui
- Park Jin-sung as Yu Shin-sung
- Song Geum-shik as Jang Dan-seol
- Shin Dong-hoon as Hwangbo Wi-gwang
- Im Byung-gi as Choi Haeng-gwi
- Lee Dae-gun as Choi Seom
- Nam Il-woo as Kim Ak
- Won Suk-yun as Wang Ham-min
- Nam Young-jin as Han Hyeon-gyu
- Lee Yong-jin as Park Seung-wi
- Park Yoo-seung as Park Seung-gyeong
- Shin Dong-il as Park Seung-rye
- Lee Gye-young as Son So
- Na Jae-gyoon as Seol Mun-u
- Cha Gi-hwan as Shik Hoi
- Oh Seung-myung as Myeong Cheon-gong
- Lee Jong-man as Ju Sul-sa
- Im Gyung-ok as Cho Seon

==== People in Goguryeo ====
- Kim Dae-hwan as Yang Man-choon
- Im Sun-taek as Yeon Gaesomoon

==== Buddhist monk ====
- Jung Wook as Tanmun, Gyunyeo's teacher
- Jung Seung-ho as Gyunyeo

==== People in Huju ====
- Kim Gi-jin as Yeo Gye-bin
- Lee Hyo-jung as Ssang-gi
- Yang Jae-sung as Ssang-chul

==== People in Eastern Jurchen ====
- Gook Jung-hwan as Yoonsun
- Maeng Bong-hak as So Moo-gae
- Park Hee-jin as Ma Si-jeo
- Kim Kang-il as Mo Il-la
- Jo Jung-gook as Sa Ga-moon

==== People in Tang dynasty ====
- Kim Hong-soo as Emperor Taizong (Korean: Taejong)
- Jung Jong-joon as Lee Se-jeok
- Jang Soon-gook as Qibi Heli (Korean: Seolpil Haryeok)

=== Extended cast ===
- Lee Dong-joon as a left general
- Lee Won-bal as a right general
- Oh Seung-myung as a fortune teller
- Shin Won-gyoon as a military officer
- Hwang Duk-jae as a military officer
- Oh Hyun-soo as Gwangjong's general
- Lee Il-woong as Cho-Seon's head assistant
- Seo Young-jin as Cho-Seon's people
- Kang Shin-jo as a rebel commander
- Kim Chang-bong as Taejo's eunuch
- Min Gyung-jin as Gwangjong's eunuch
- Park Joon-ah as Queen Janghwa's court lady
- Park Jong-sul as the people
- Han Choon-il as the people
- Lee Chul-min as a flat shooter

== Awards and nominations ==
Year	Award	Category	Recipient	Result
2002	KBS Drama Awards	Top Excellence in Acting Awards, Best Actor	Kim Sang-joong	Won
