= Geumsansa =

Buddhist temple in Gimje, South Korea

- 금산사
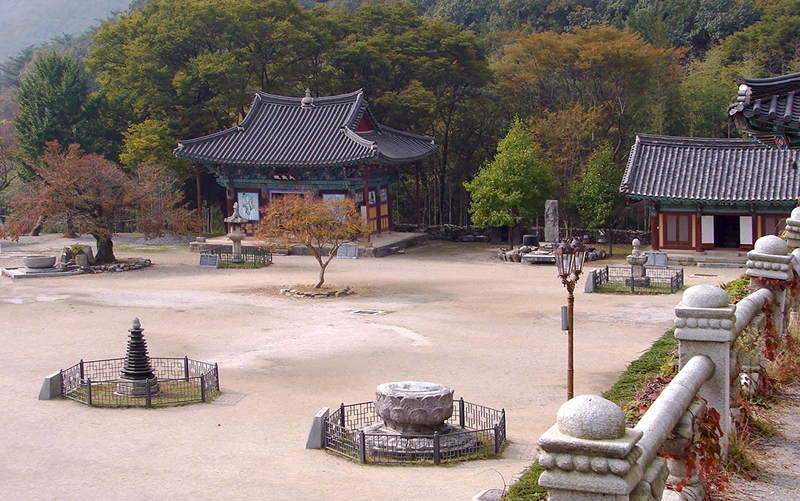
- Gemusansa area

Religion
- Affiliation: Buddhism
- Sect: Jogye Order

Location
- Location: 1 Moak 15-gil, Geumsan-myeon, Gimje, North Jeolla Province, South Korea
- Country: South Korea
- Interactive map of Geumsansa
- Coordinates: 35°43′22.3″N 127°03′12.3″E

Korean name
- Hangul: 금산사
- Hanja: 金山寺
- RR: Geumsansa
- MR: Kŭmsansa

Geumsansa (Korean: 금산사; lit. 'Golden Mountain Temple') is a temple of the Jogye Order of Korean Buddhism standing on the slopes of Moaksan in Gimje City, Jeollabuk-do, South Korea.

== History ==
The first Geumsansa was built during the reign of King Beop of Baekje (r. 599–600 AD). While some sources say "established 600" and others "built 599", the 1635 compilation, Geumsansa sajeok (hanja:金山寺事蹟, Chronicle of Geumsan Temple) records that the temple was established in 600 by Baekje (18 BCE–660 CE), one of the Three Kingdoms of Korea that ruled the Korean Peninsula during this period. The year indicates both the second year of King Beop's short-lived reign (r. 599–600) and the first year of the subsequent ruler and his son, King Mu (r. 600–641).

According to the document, as a faithful Buddhist, King Beop issued a royal edict to prohibit the killing of any living creatures in 599 and ordained 38 Buddhist monks. Conversely, according to the Cultural Heritage Administration of South Korea and others, Geumsasa was built in 599, the first year of King Beop. Regardless of the founding date, it was assumed not to have been a significant temple in the scope of its scale and character.

From 722, during the reign of King Gyeongdeok of Silla until 766 in King Hyegong's reign, Geumsansa was rebuilt and greatly expanded under the direction of Master Jinpyo. According to the tradition, Master Jinpyo had a vision of Maitreya, the Buddha of the future, and received a book on divination in two rolls along with 189 divination sticks from Maitreya. Jinpyo thereafter created a statue of the Maitreya to be enshrined in the main hall which became the basis of the East Asian Yogācāra school. As a result of the expansion, Geumsansa became the headquarters for practicing the Maitreya faith during Later Silla (668–935).

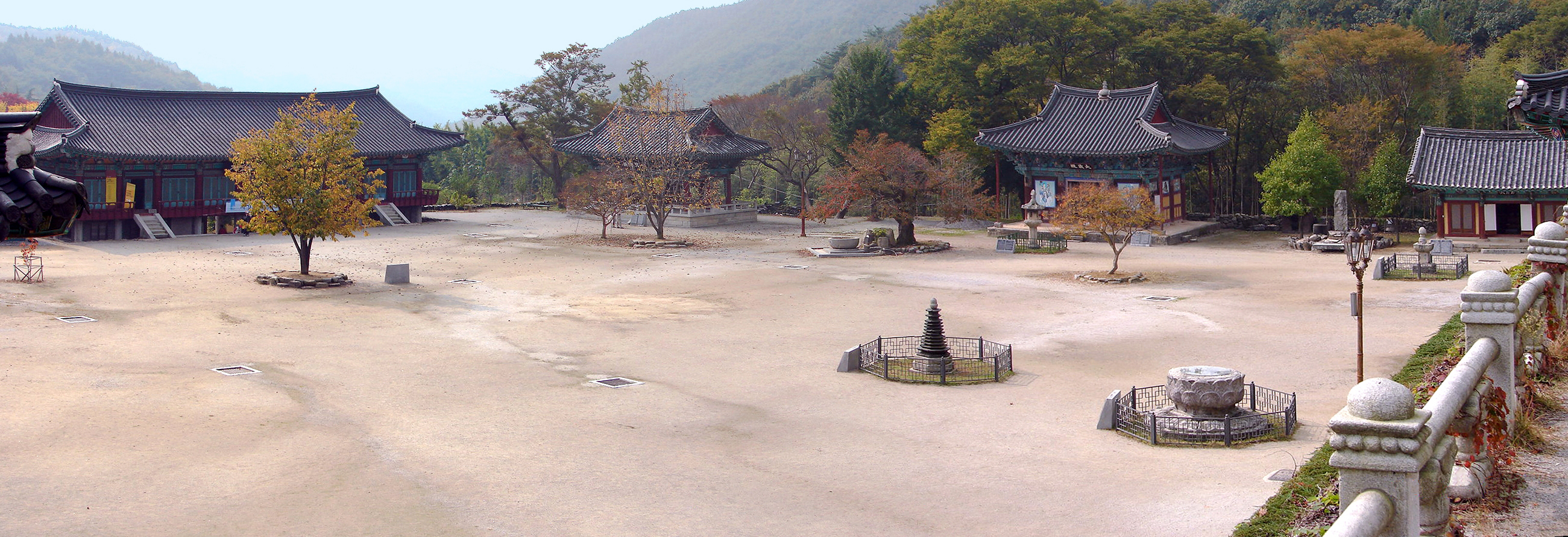

After the expansion, Kyŏn Hwŏn (r. 900–935) who is the founder of Later Baekje (892–936) protected the temple. Although it is said that he issued orders to carry out partial repairs for Geumsansa, there is no certainty over whether the repairs actually occurred. Kyŏn Hwŏn was held captive at Geumsansa when his son, Kyŏn Sin-gŏm, usurped the throne. In 1079 as the Royal Preceptor Hyedeok was appointed as the head master of Geumsasa, he completely renovated the temple by erecting various additional sanctuaries. This led to Geumsansa's era of cultural blooming.

During the first Japanese military campaign of Hideyoshi Toyotomi in 1592, Geumsansa also played a defensive role. The Buddhist volunteer corps, with over a thousand monks led by Master Noemuk (뇌묵대사) used Geumsansa for a training ground. During the second Japanese military campaign, the Buddhist volunteer corps established their headquarters at Geumsansa. However, the entire temple complex subsequently suffered a tragic fate when the pavilion and outlying hermitages were burned to the ground by the invading Japanese forces.

The present buildings were rebuilt in 1635 after the previous ones were destroyed by the Japanese invasions of Korea. The temple currently serves as one of the principle Buddhist centers in the region and is one of the largest temples in South Korea. Most of the treasures were created prior to the time of present buildings.

== Geumsansa Treasures ==
=== Mireukjeon - National Treasure #62 ===
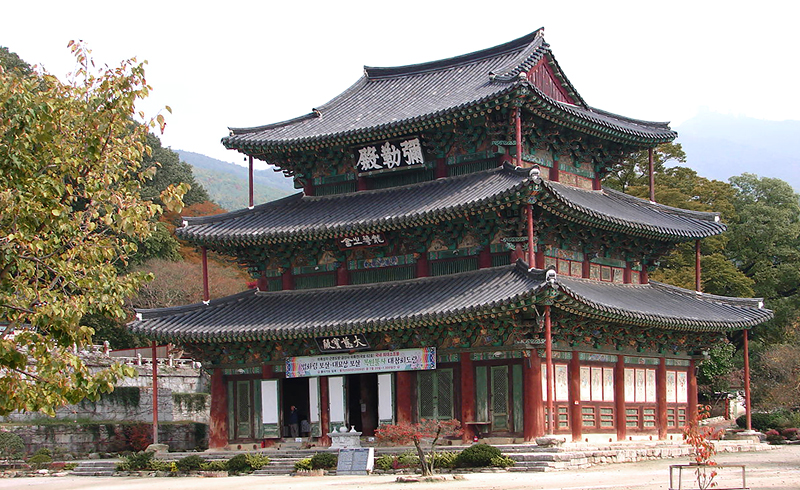
Maitreya Hall, housing a large Mireuksa Buddha (Buddha of the Future).

Geumsansa Mireukjeon (Mireukjeon Hall of the Geumsansa Temple): Maitreya Hall is a three-story wooden structure making it unique among Korean Buddhist halls. Mireukjeon houses a large statue of Mireuksa Buddha (Buddha of the Future). The hall was (re-)constructed in 1635. The first floor is called Daejabojeon ("Hall of Great Mercy and Treasure"), the second Yonghwajihoe ("Gathering of Dragon and Beauty") and the third Mireukjeon ("Hall of Maitreya"). On the first and second floors there are five rooms at the front and four rooms off to the side. On the third floor there are three rooms at the front and two rooms off to the side. The roofs of the first and second levels are supported by six pillars across the front and back of the building, with five pillars running along each side. On the third level the roof is supported by four pillars running across the front and back and three pillars along the sides. Clusters of brackets support the eaves of the roofs while the main wooden support pillar on the inside of the hall is made of multiple pieces. These pillars are constructed in the minheullim style, meaning the pillar gets thinner as it ascends.

Mireukjeon is constructed using a multi-beam style where the eaves beams are not only placed above the pillars supporting the eaves, but also amongst the supporting pillars.

=== Noju - Treasure #22 ===
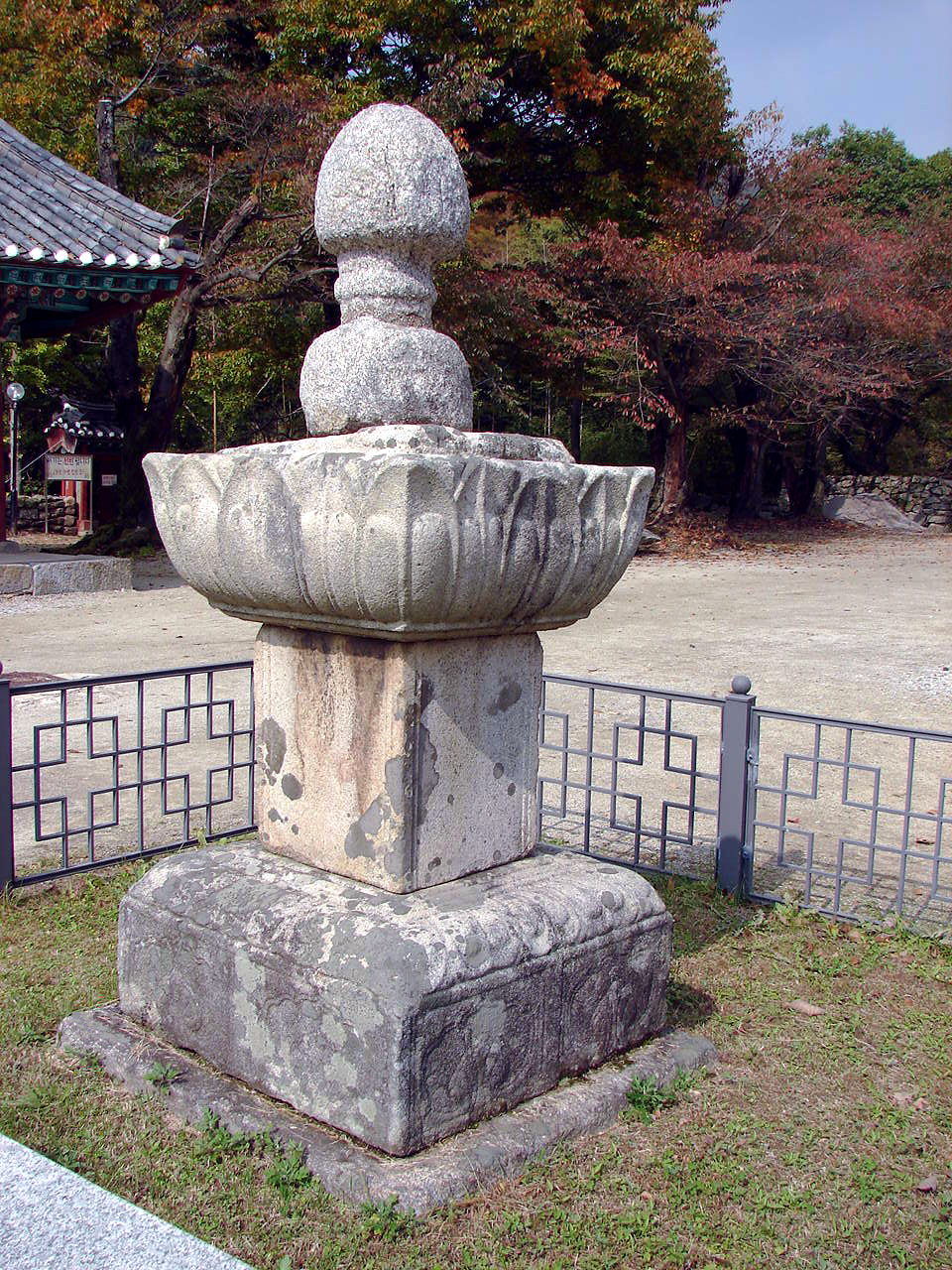
Noju

Geumsansa Noju (금산사 노주, Noju of the Geumsansa Temple).

Described as a relic, Noju is found between two of the temple's buildings, Daejeokgwangjeon Hall and Daejanggak Hall. Noju is believed to date from the early Goryeo period or the 10th century. The function or purpose of this relic remains unknown. With the small sculpture of a bud positioned on the top removed, it may have served as a square pedestal for an image of the Buddha. Noju is constructed of three stone pedestals neatly layered at the bottom, middle and top. The bud-shaped magic stone ornament found at the peak of the relic is similar to that found at the apex of a wooden pagoda. Pole patterns are engraved on the back and edge of the bottom pedestal with eight longish ovals on the surface. The 16 petals of a lotus flower are engraved on the front. The middle pedestal has no decoration on its sides. The 16 petals of the lotus flower motif found at the bottom is repeated on the top pedestal, but with the lotus flower petals on the top pedestal being longer and slimmer than those found on the bottom pedestal. Each side of the base is 1.2 metres (3 ft 11 in) long making the relic 2.3 metres (7 ft 7 in) tall.

=== Seongnyeondae - Treasure #23 ===
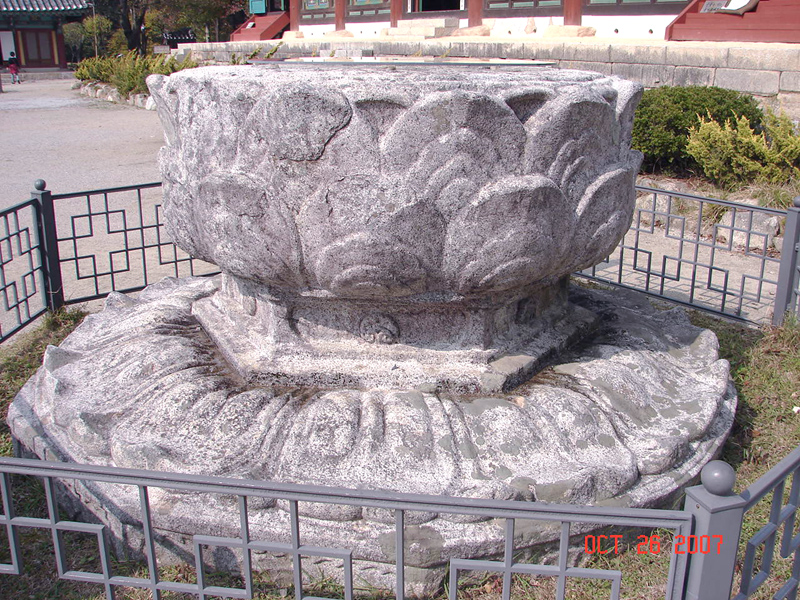
Seongnyeondae, Lotus-shaped stone pedestal.

Geumsansa Seongnyeondae (Stone lotus pedestal of Geumsansa Temple).

Seongnyeondae is a finely detailed lotus-shaped stone pedestal that historians believe dates back to the 10th century between the Unified Silla Dynasty and the early Goryeo Dynasty. The pedestal is constructed from one solid piece of stone with the top surface cut level and pierced by two square holes at the top, which are believed to have accommodated an image of the Buddha. The middle belt is embossed with a floral pattern while the top belt has a hexagonal pattern. In general, this stone pedestal utilizes the style and form typical of that from the Unified Silla Dynasty.

=== Hyedeogwangsa Jineungtapbi - Treasure #24 ===
Hyedeogwangsa Jineungtapbi (Monument to the high priest Hyedeogwangsa of Geumsansa Temple).

This tortoise shaped pedestal carved out of a piece single stone is a tombstone believed to have been made to memorialize the renowned monk Hyedeo Gwangsa of the middle era of the Goryeo Dynasty. The tombstone's foundation stone has been lost and the epitaph is badly damaged to the extent that deciphering what is written is difficult.

Hyedeo was born in the fourth year of King Jeongjong of Goryeo (1038). He started learning Buddhist teachings at the age of four and became a Buddhist monk shortly thereafter. In 1079 King Sukjong promoted Hyedeo to the position of chief of the temple. He was later assigned as the chief of the Buddhist body of the state by King Sukjong.

After Hyedeo died at the age of 59, King Sukjong raised Hyedeo's status to "State Mentor" and renamed him "Hyedeok" and the pagoda "Jineung."

=== Ocheung Seoktap - Treasure #25 ===
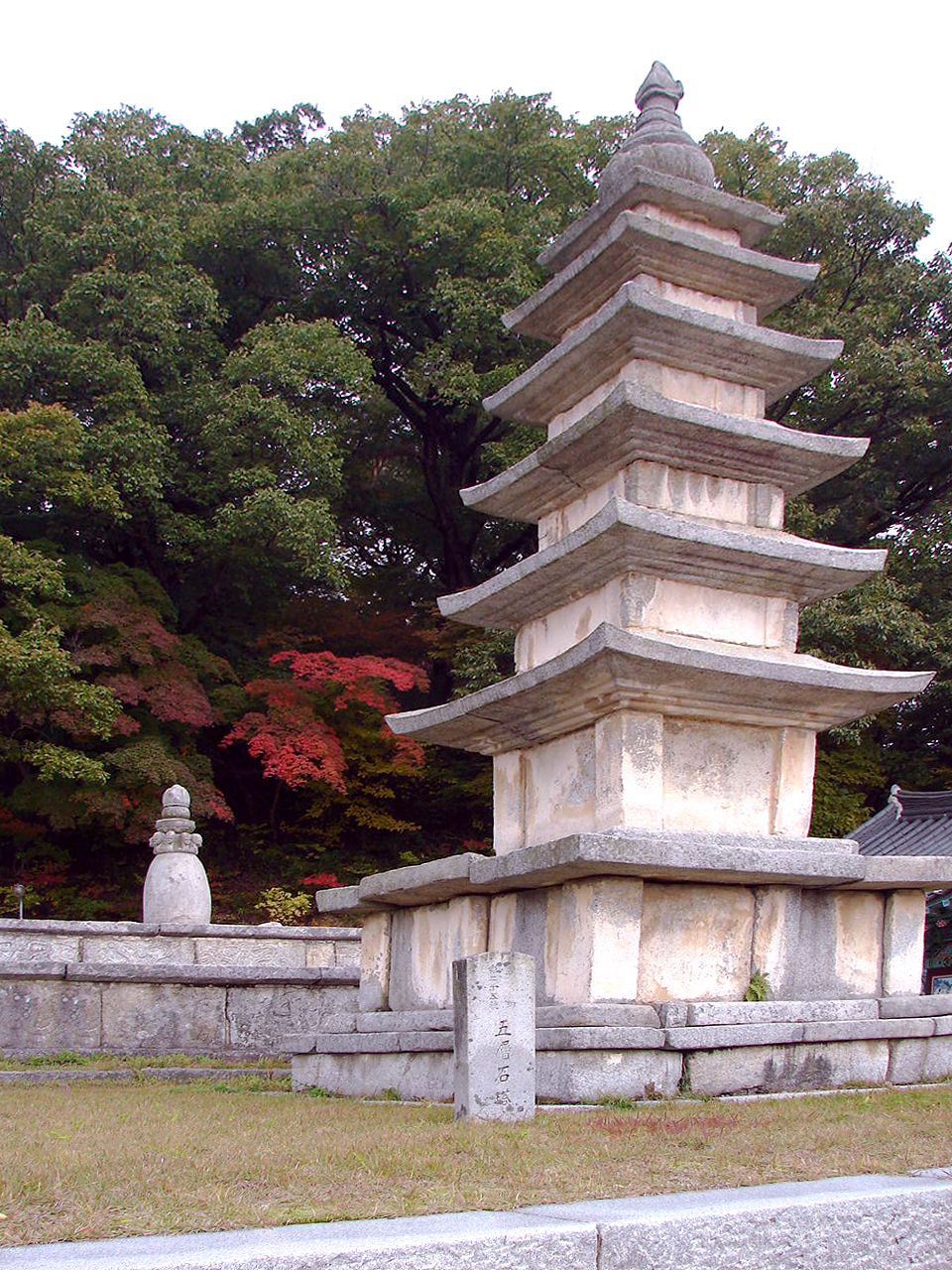
Ocheung Seoktap

Ocheung Seoktap (Five storied stone pagoda of Geumsansa Temple).

This five storied stone pagoda is situated on the top of Songdae, the two-story stylobate, a large tall pedestal at the north side of Geumsansa Temple. A sarira stair is found behind the pagoda. Although only five stories tall, the roof of the pagoda causes it appear to be more like a six-storied structure. The bottom layer of the base is short and narrows at the top where it holds the cap stone. The large square base supporting the main body of the pagoda is oversized. Each of the pagoda's stories diminish in size as they ascend and each story has reliefs carved into each of the four corners. The eaves of the roof stone form gentle upturned curves.

A distinguishing feature of this pagoda is the base of pagoda finial, which looks like a roof stone. It is designed to support the finial at the top of the pagoda and gives the pagoda a distinct appearance.

=== Bangdeunggyedan - Treasure #26 ===
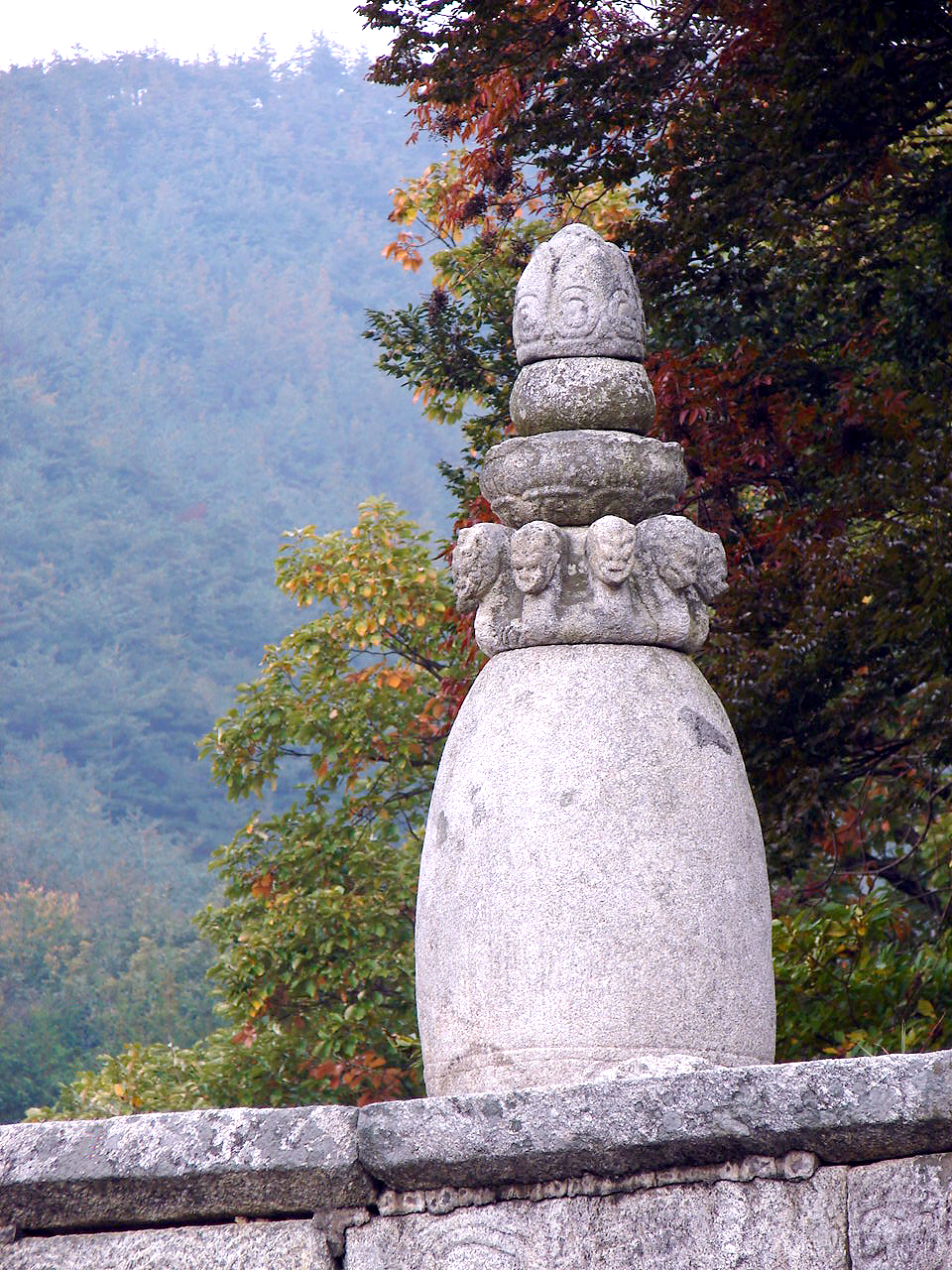
Bangdeunggyedan (Ordination Altar)

Geumsansabangdeunggyedan (Ordination altar of Geumsansa Temple).

Bangdeunggyedan is a stone pagoda in the shape of a bell, which appeared during the late Silla Dynasty and is thought to have been adapted from the Indian Buddhist temple style.

This stone pagoda stands on top of a stylobate, a wide two story square stone platform found on the north side of the temple complex. The stylobate is engraved on each side with images of Buddha and the Four Devas, the guardians of Buddhist temple.

Stone railings were probably supported on the stone posts still found surrounding the lower layer of the stylobate. The stone posts have carved images of the Four Deva's faces on each of their four corners. The engravings with images of the Four Devas on the stylobate and the stone railings posts indicate that there was once a sarira stair to store the Buddha's own sarira.

The main body of the pagoda has engravings of lion's faces around the edge and a lotus flower in the center. Near the top are nine carved dragons with their heads protruding out under the two stone plates engraved with a lotus flower.

The oldest stone bell pagoda still existing in Korea today is Bangdeunggyedan. Judging from the fine structure of the sculptures and ornamentation historians believe this pagoda was built during the early period of the Goryeo Dynasty.

=== Yukgak Tachung Soktap - Treasure #27 ===
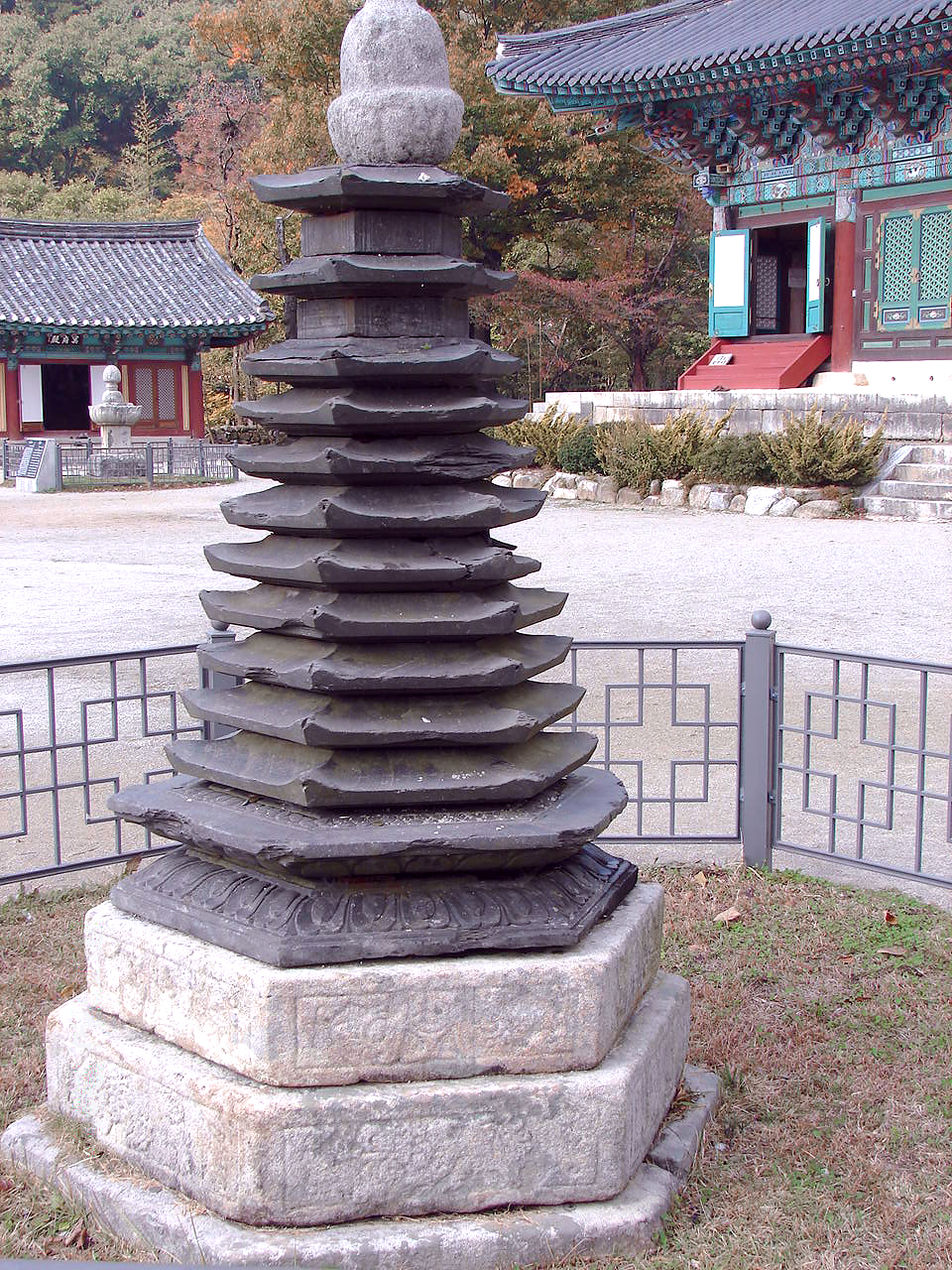
Yukgak Tachung Soktap.

Geumsansayukgakdacheungseoktap (Hexagonal multi-storied stone pagoda of Geumsansa Temple).

This hexagonal multi-stored 2.18 metres (7 ft 2 in) high stupa, Yukgak Tachung Soktap, differs from typical square shaped granite pagodas in that it is a hexagonal stone pagoda made of black-and-white clay slate. From the engraving methods used on the main body and the roof stone it is estimated to have been built around the early Goryeo period (918–1392) and was moved here from the nearby Bongcheonwon Hermitage. The pagoda is assumed to have had a single story stone core for the main body of the pagoda. Now only the top two stories remain. A lotus flower pattern is engraved on the stylobate. The roof stones slope gently on the outer surface of the roof, but curve sharply at the corners. Due to the disappearance of the original capstone, a decorated granite finial was added later.

The pagoda creates a unique mood through the use of clay slate, the main ingredient of ink-stones, and maintains a gentle and delicate ratio as it ascends.

=== Dangganjiju - Treasure #28 ===
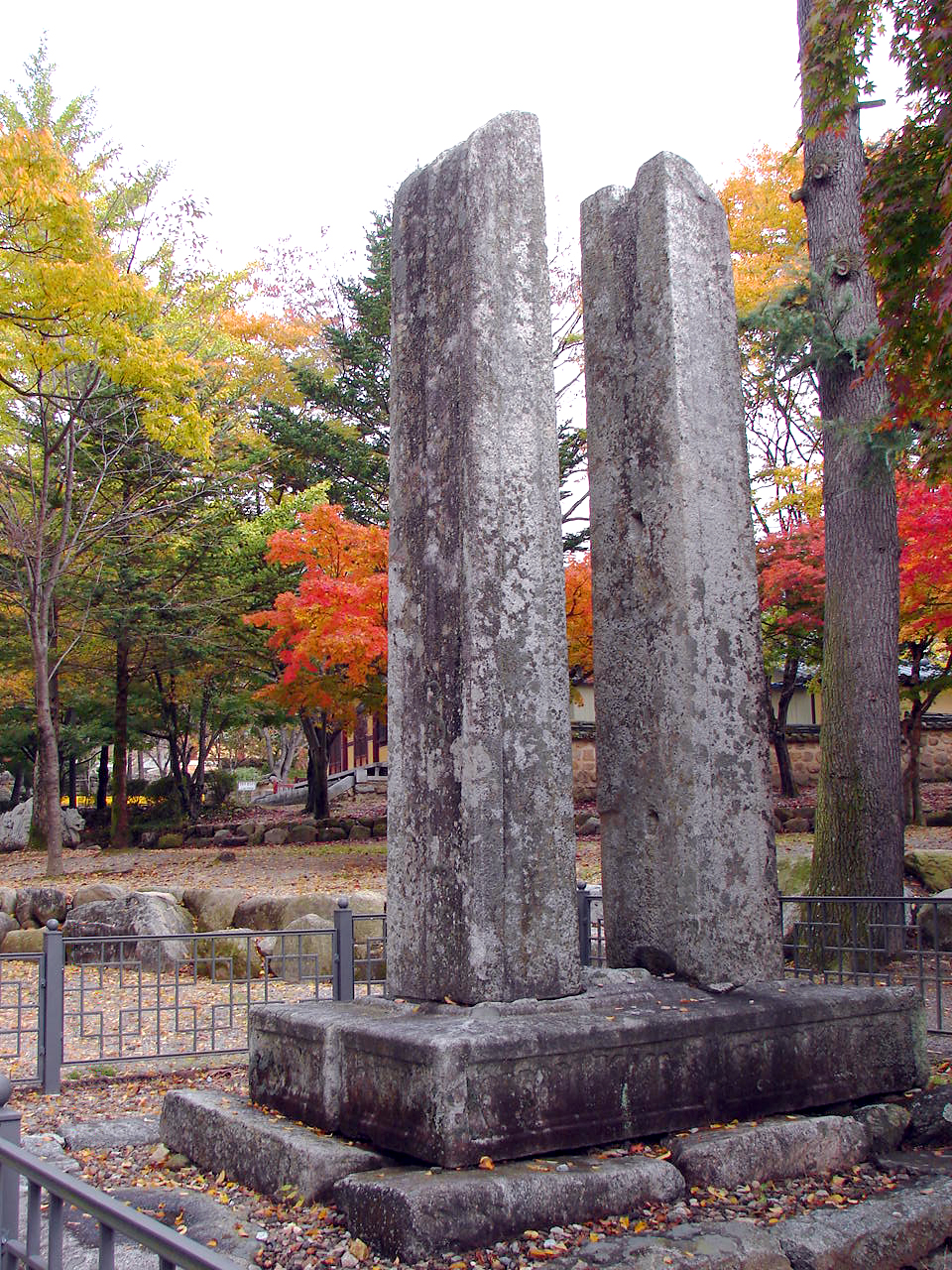
Dangganjiju flag poles

Geumsansa Dangganjiju (금산사 당간지주, Buddhist flagpole supports of Geumsansa Temple).

Dangganjiju are the two flag pole supports used to support the flag for a ceremony at a Buddhist temple. When a ceremony is held, the event and location of the temple are indicated by a flag mounted on a stone or iron flag pole.

The two posts forming the flag pole support are 3.5 metres (11 ft) tall and lie in a north–south orientation. There are three holes one above the other in the supports to hold the flag pole. Placement of the holes in this manner is indicative of the style used during the Unified Silla period and is similar to those seen at Bomun-ri from the Gyeongju period, and at the Mireuksa (Temple) site.

Dangganjiju is the only flag pole support in Korea still retaining its original base. Historians believe these supports were erected during the late 8th century Silla period. It was designated as the 28th "Treasure" (bomul) by the government on January 21, 1963.

=== Simwonam Hwagang Samcheung Seoktap -Treasure #29 ===
Geumsansa simwonam hwagangam cheungseoktap (Three storied granite pagoda of Simwonam Hermitage at Geumsansa Temple).

This three story stone pagoda mounted on a two-story stylobate is located near the peak to the north of Simwonam Rock at Simwonam (hermitage). The pagoda maintains the engraved pole pattern on its four edges and at the center of the pagoda's main body. Three flat broad roof stones cover each body stone forming a strong slope along the outer surface of the roof, which gently curves on the edge of the eaves in keeping with the typical of architectural style of the Goryeo period. The location of the pagoda deep in the mountain has contributed to its near perfect condition.

Although the broad roof stones and the strong slope of the eaves are typical of a style of the pagodas of the Silla (57 BC-935 AD) period, this pagoda actually dates to the Goryeo period (918–1392).

=== Daejangjeon - Treasure #827 ===
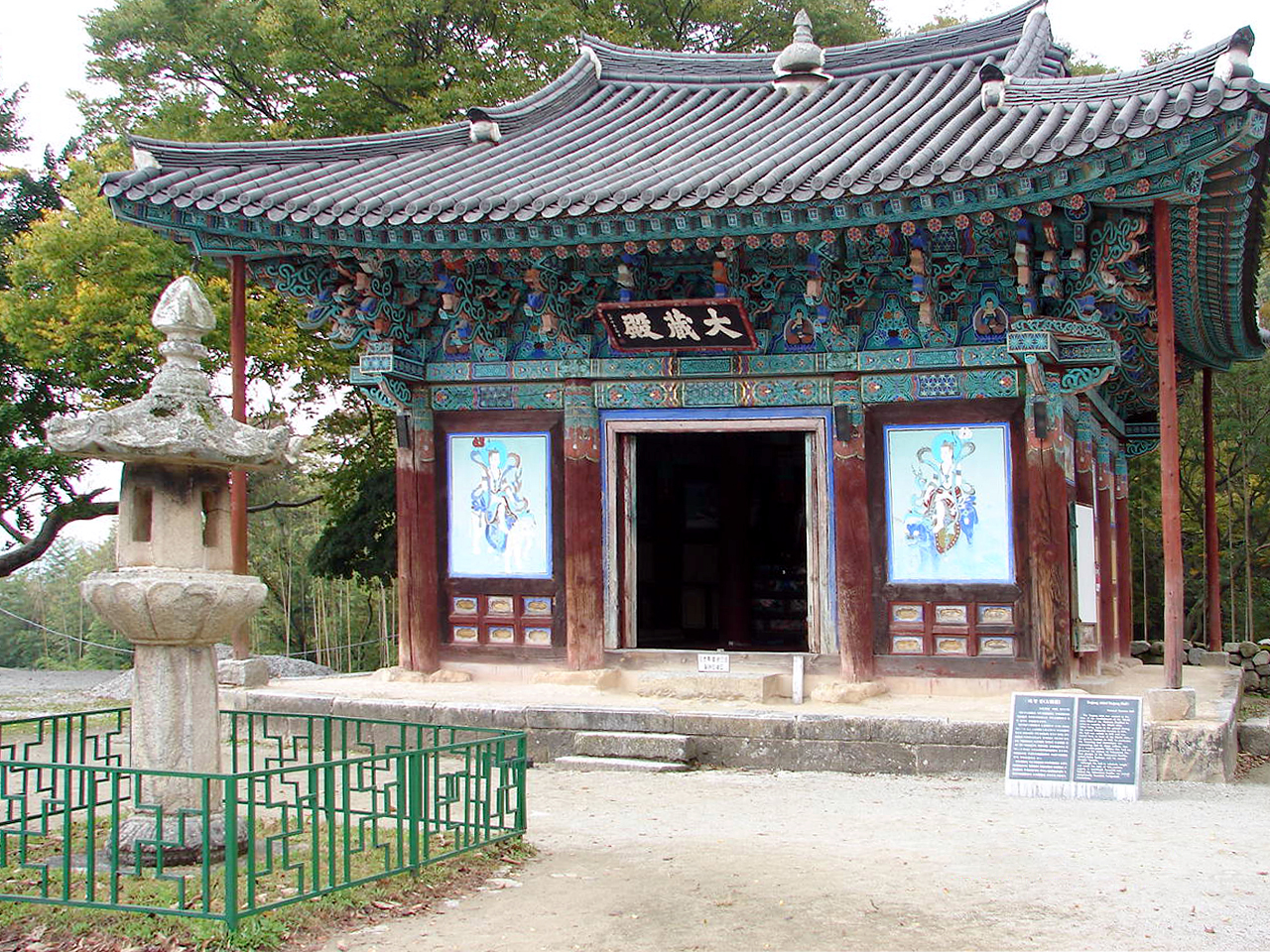
Daejangjeon

Geumsansadaejangjeon (Daejangjeon Hall of Geumsansa Temple).

Daejangjeon at Geumsansa was originally an octagonal wooden pagoda erected in the 600s CE during the Baekje period. It was rebuilt in 1635 as a hall, during the Joseon period (July 1392 – August 1910) and in 1922 was moved to its present location. Visible on the roof ridge beam is a portion of the finial that topped the original wooden pagoda. Images of the Sakyamuni Buddha and his two most capable disciples, Kasyapa and Ananda are now enshrined within Daejangjeon. The Sakyamuni Buddha is seated on an elaborately engraved Sumidan pedestal. This single story hall has three rooms along the sides and incorporates a hipped and gabled roof representing the most elaborate style of this era. A few images along the top the hall's roof line reveal a hint of its past as a wooden pagoda.

Daejangjeon's ceiling is latticed while the interior construction utilizes two tiered multiclustered brackets on top of the columns in the middle section. Single tiered multiclustered brackets are utilized on top of the columns on the outer tie beams between the columns in each of the side sections.

The architectural study of this era's wooden pagodas is greatly enhanced by this small simple modified hall.

=== Seokdeung - Treasure #828 ===
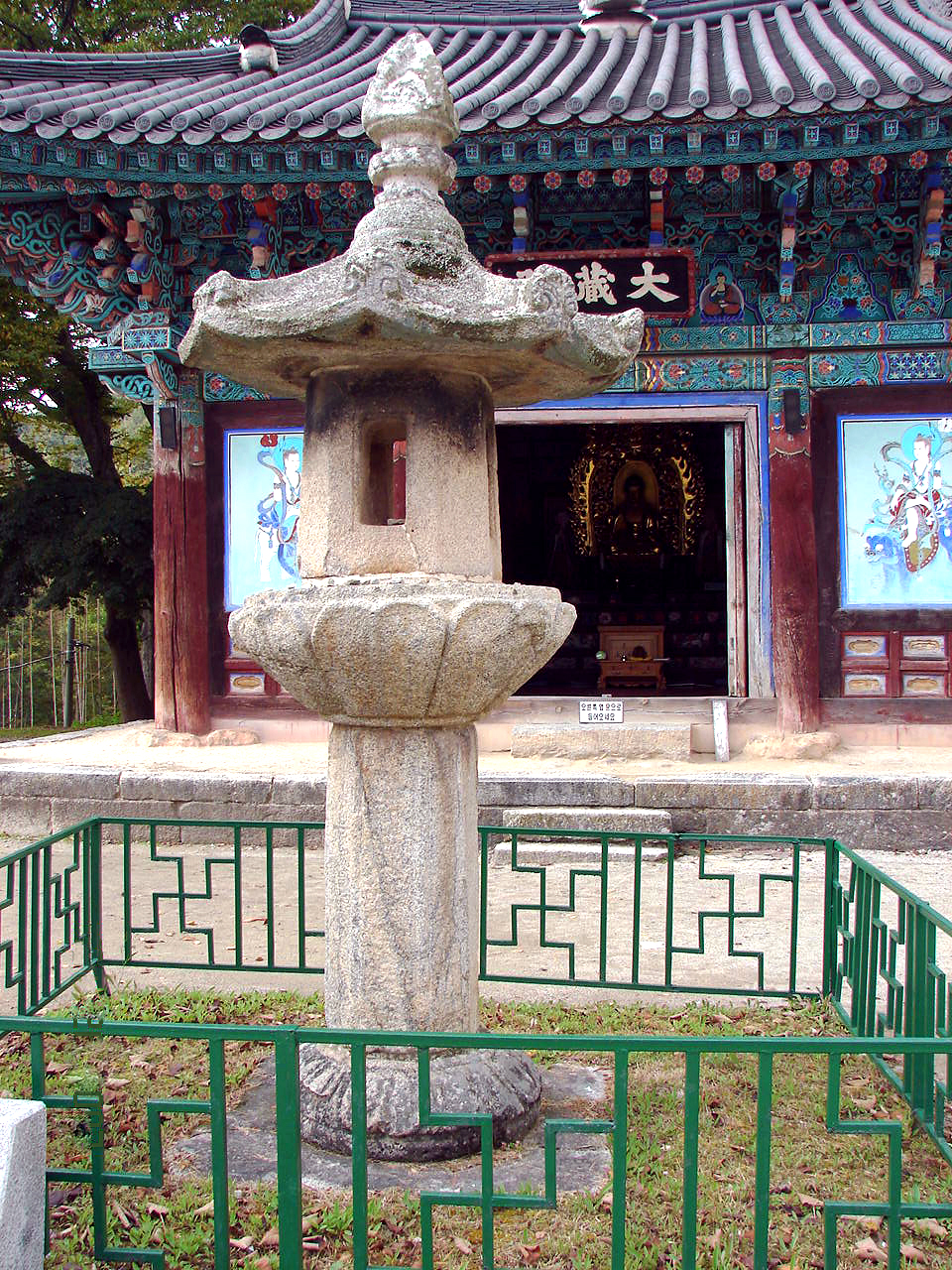
Geumsansa Seokdeung (Stone Lamp), or lamp of enlightenment.

Geumsansaseokdeung (Stone lantern of Geumsansa Temple).

Geumsansa Seokdeung (Stone Lamp), or the "lamp of enlightenment", is located in the front yard of Daejangjeon Hall, where it was used to light the front of the worship hall. Made of granite and measuring 3.9 metres (13 ft) high, the lamp dates back to the Goryeo period (918–1392). It was moved to its present location in 1922. Its square foundation stone is carved with a double lotus pattern while the octagonal base has straight lines engraved along the length to represent the cosmos or to emulate pillars. The upper section of the lamp is carved as a lotus in full bloom.

The upper pedestal forms the base of the light camber, which in its upper octagonal section has windows on four sides. Decorative engravings of lotus petals are found on both the base and upper part of the pedestal.

== Tourism ==
It also offers temple stay programs where visitors can experience Buddhist culture.

== Gallery ==
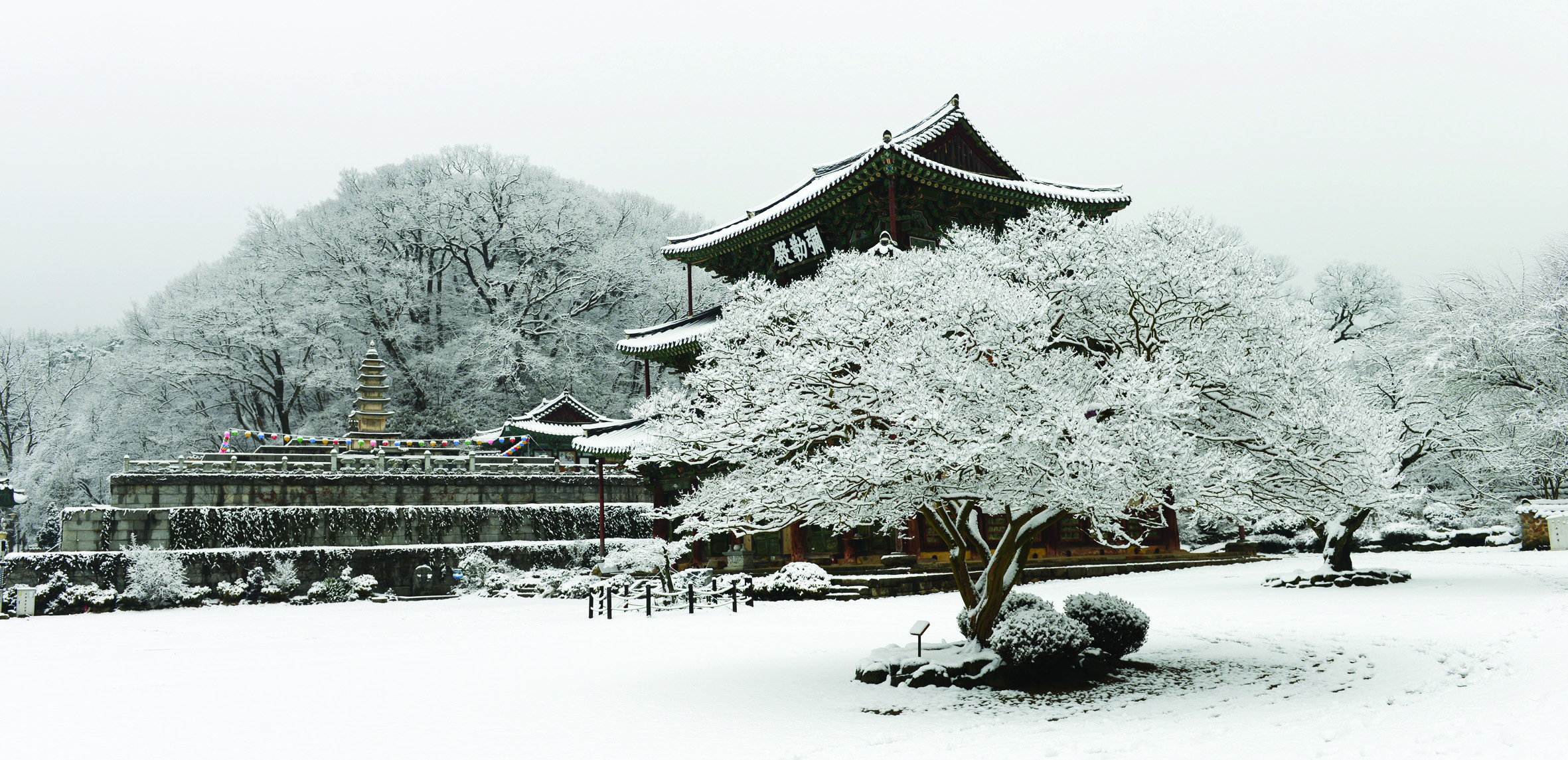

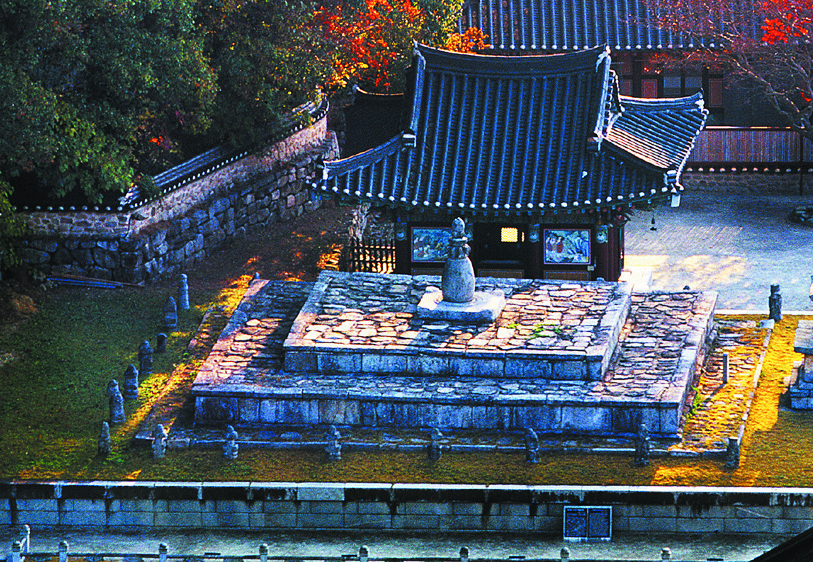

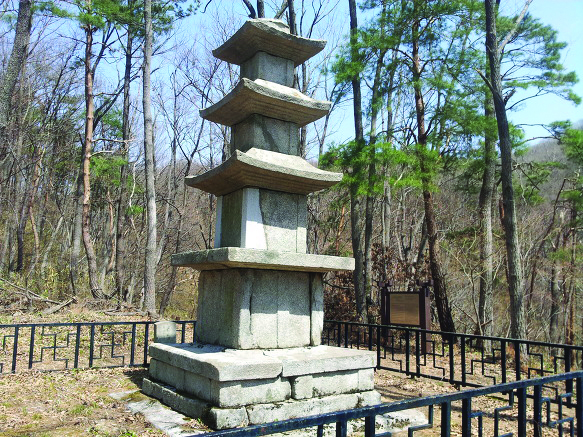

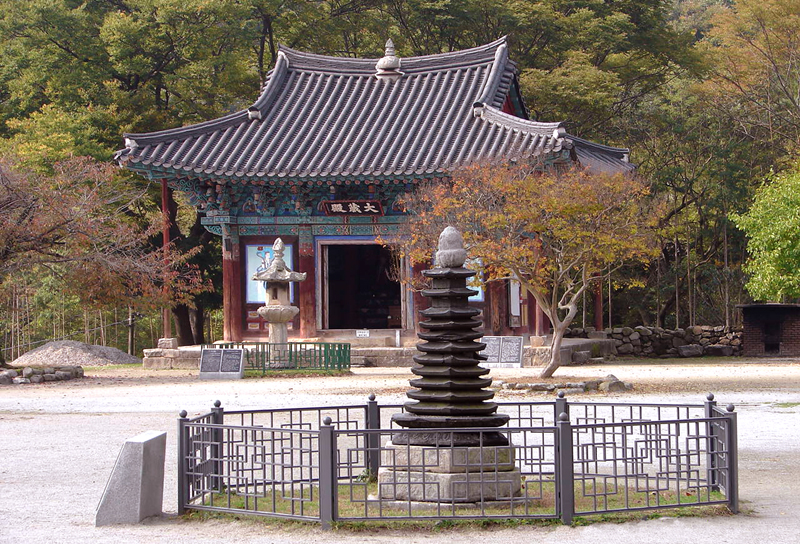

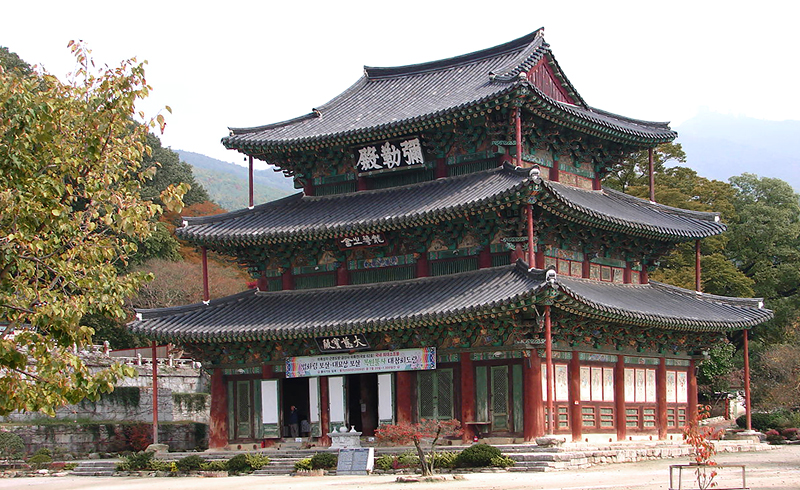

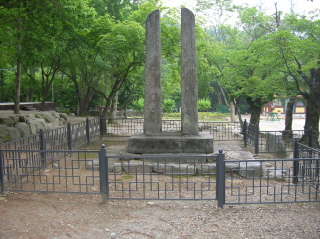

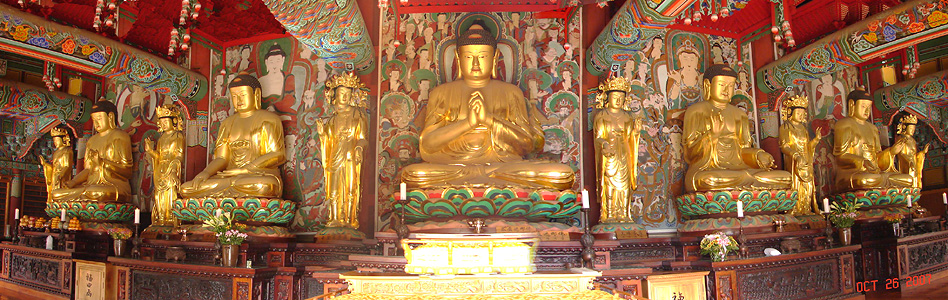

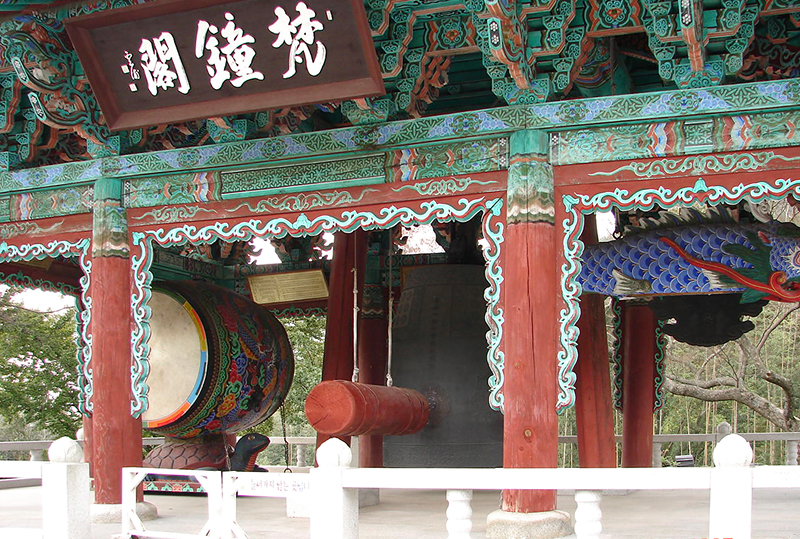

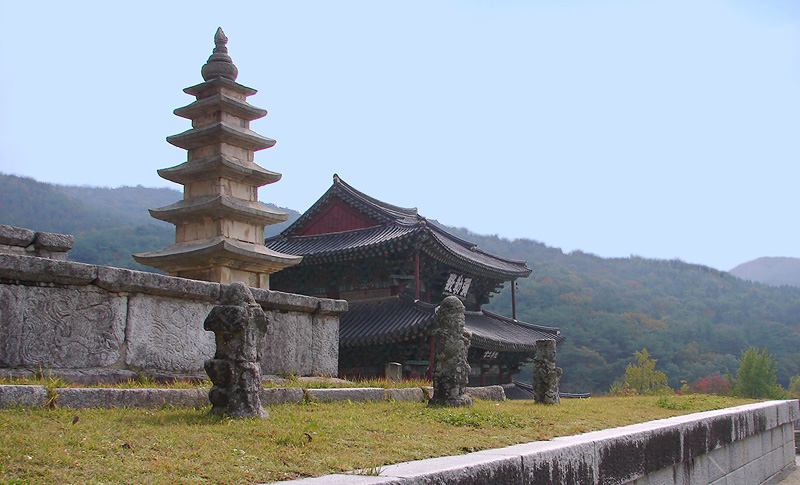

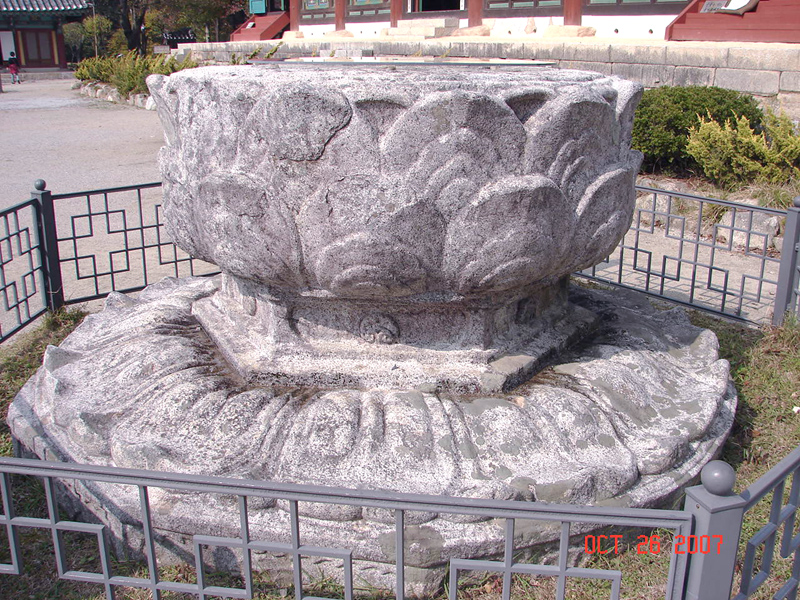

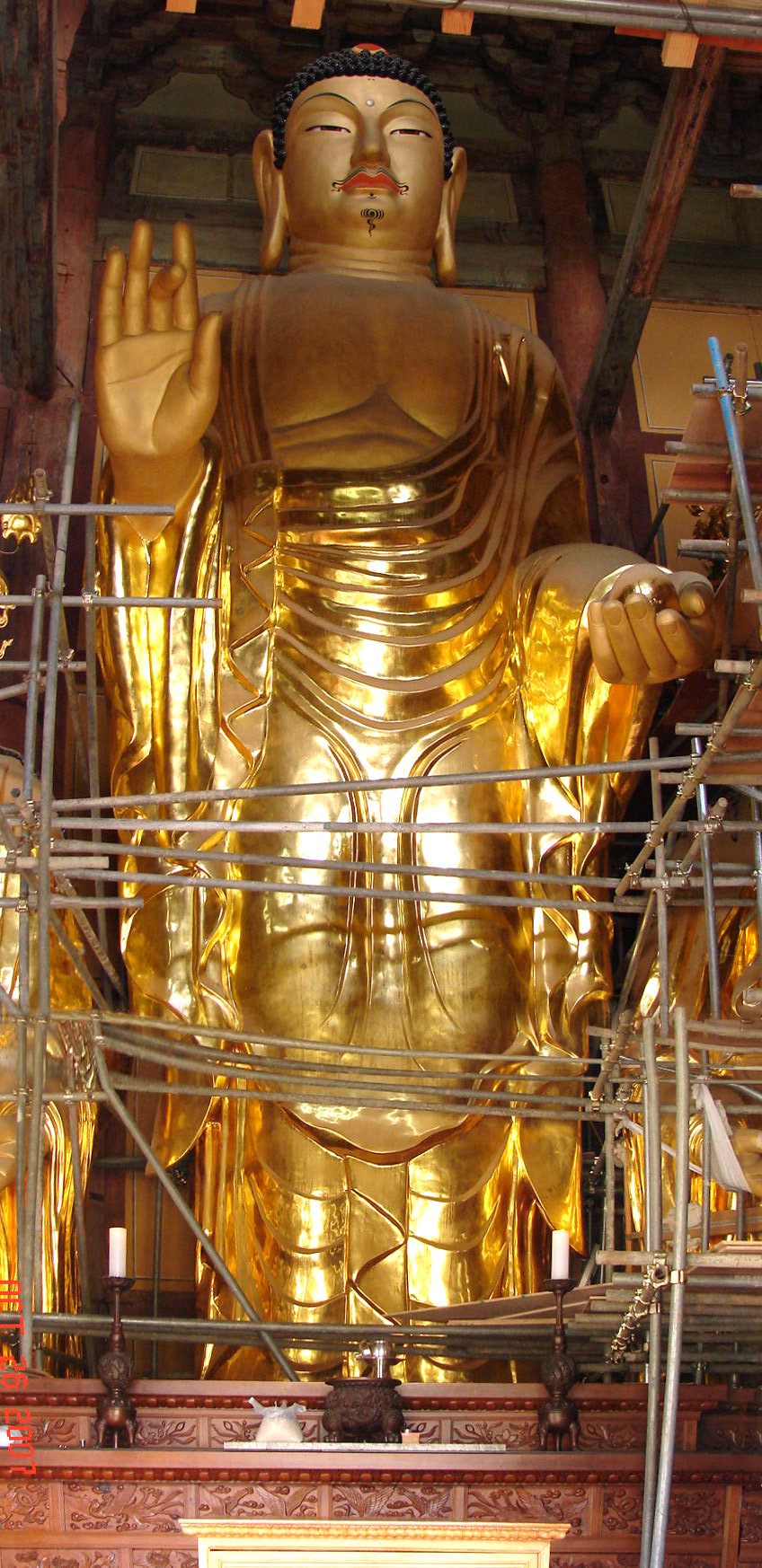

== See also ==
- Jogye Order
- Korean Buddhism
- East Asian Yogācāra
- Korean Buddhist temples
- Religion in South Korea
