= Queen Munseong =

Goryeo queen consort (fl. 10th century)

Queen Munseong 문성왕후

Queen consort of Goryeo
- Tenure: ?–?
- Predecessor: Queen Mungong
- Successor: Queen Daemok
- Spouse: Jeongjong of Goryeo
- Issue: Prince Gyeongchunwon; A daughter
Posthumous name
- Munseong (문성, 文成; "Civil and Constructive")
- House: Suncheon Pak clan
- Father: Pak Yŏng-gyu
- Mother: Kyŏn Ae-bok
- Religion: Buddhism

Queen Munseong of the Suncheon Pak clan (Korean: 문성왕후 박씨; Hanja: 文成王后 朴氏) was a Later Baekje royal family member as the youngest maternal granddaughter of Kyŏn Hwŏn who became a Goryeo queen consort as the second wife of King Jeongjong. She was the mother of his children, Prince Gyeongchunwon and a daughter who would marry Wang Im-ju, her half-uncle. Queen Munseong was the youngest sister, along with Lady Dongsanwon and Queen Mungong.

== In popular culture ==
- Portrayed by Kim Hyo-joo in the 2002–2003 KBS TV series The Dawn of the Empire.
