= Seo In-seok =

South Korean actor

- Born: February 22, 1949 (age 77); Seoul, South Korea
- Occupation: Actor
- Years active: 1976–present
- Children: Seo Jang-won (son)

Korean name
- Hangul: 서인석
- Hanja: 徐仁錫
- RR: Seo Inseok
- MR: Sŏ Insŏk

Seo In-seok (born February 22, 1949) is a South Korean actor. Seo made his acting debut in 1976, and among his notable television series are the historical dramas Emperor Wang Gun (2000) and Jeong Do-jeon (2014).

== Filmography ==
=== Television series ===
Year	Title	Role	Network
1976	The Mourning Dove		KBS
1977	I Regret It		MBC
1978	Young Master		MBC
1978	Geese		KBS
1979	Land	Gil-sang	KBS
1980	Dongshimcho	Second son	KBS
1982	Soon-ae		KBS2
1982	Three Sisters		KBS2
1983	Gaekju		KBS2
1983	Diary of a High School Student	Homeroom teacher	KBS1
1984	Independence Gate	Syngman Rhee	KBS1
1984	Garden Balsam		KBS2
1985	Dawn		KBS1
1985	Lights and Shadows	Sung-goo	KBS2
1986	Your Portrait		KBS2
1986	Warm River	Seo-hyun	KBS2
1987	TV's The Art of War	Liu Bei	KBS2
1988	Soon-shim-yi		KBS2
1989	Moonlight Family	Kim Joon-ho	KBS2
1990	Days of the Dynasty	Yi Un	KBS1
1990	Stepping Stone	Jo Min-gu	KBS1
1991	Dongui Bogam (Mirror of Eastern Medicine)	Heo Jun	MBC
1992	Chronicles of the Three Kingdoms	Kim Yu-sin	KBS1
1994	Han Myung-hoi	King Sejo	KBS2
1994	Love Blooming in the Classroom		KBS2
1995	West Palace	Lee Yi-cheom	KBS2
1996	Eunhasu (Milky Way)	Kim Man-deuk	KBS1
1996	Dad's Soul		KBS2
1997	Palace of Dreams	Han Dong-soo	SBS
1997	Because I Really	Hong Woo-pyo	KBS2
1998	Legendary Ambition	Jang Hyung-pil	KBS2
1998	Will Make You Happy	Young-ja's husband	KBS2
1998	Eun-ah's Daughter	Kim Dal-soo	KBS1
1998	The Solid Man	Kang Dong-soo	SBS
1999	I'm Still Loving You	Kim Hyung-joon's older brother	MBC
2000	Taejo Wang Geon	Kyon Hwon	KBS1
2000	I Want to Keep Seeing You	Jang Se-yoon	SBS
2002	That Woman Catches People	Baek Soo-san	SBS
2003	Age of Warriors	Yi Ui-bang	KBS1
2003	KBS TV Novel – "Briar Flower"	Choi Myung-wook	KBS1
2004	Magic	Lee Dae-hae	SBS
2004	Hyung (My Older Brother)	Ji Hyun-tae	KBS2
2005	5th Republic	Roh Tae-woo	MBC
2005	Don't Worry	Choi Kyung-joon	KBS2
2006	Yeon Gaesomun	Emperor Taizong of Tang	SBS
2007	Kimcheed Radish Cubes	Lee Seung-yong	MBC
2008	Family's Honor	Ha Seok-ho	SBS
2010	Jejungwon	Baek Tae-hyun	SBS
2010	The King of Legend	Heukganggong Sahul	KBS1
2012	Take Care of Us, Captain	Hong Myung-jin	SBS
2012	HDTV Literature – "The Endless World of Literature"	Chang-soo	KBS1
2012	Dream of the Emperor	Suk Eul-jong	KBS1
2014	Jeong Do-jeon	Choe Yeong	KBS1
2018	Secrets and Lies	Oh Sang-pil	MBC

=== Film ===
Year	Title	Role
1980	Earth Tremors	
1984	Sadness Even in the Sky	
2007	Fight	Yang Dae-ho

== Theater ==
Year	Title	Role
1977	The Island	
2007	Hamlet	King Seon
2010	The Road to Mecca	Rev. Marius Byleveld
2010	The Marriage of Figaro	Count Almaviva
2022	The Two Popes	Pope Benedict XVI

== Awards and nominations ==
Year	Award	Category	Nominated work	Result
1975	Korean Theater and Film Awards	Best New Actor		Won
1978	14th Dong-A Theatre Awards	Grand Prize (Daesang)	The Island	Won
1986	22nd Baeksang Arts Awards	Best Actor (TV)	Lights and Shadows	Won
1990	27th Savings Day	Presidential Citation	—N/a	Won
1990	KBS Drama Awards	Top Excellence Award, Actor	Days of the Dynasty, Stepping Stone, TV's The Art of War	Won
1997	KBS Drama Awards	Top Excellence Award, Actor	Because I Really	Won
2001	38th Savings Day	Civil Merit Medal	—N/a	Won
2001	KBS Drama Awards	Top Excellence Award, Actor	Emperor Wang Gun	Won
