= Ajagae =

Military leader

Ajagae 아자개
- Born: Sabeol-ju, Silla
- Died: Yeonsan-seong, Silla
- Other names: Yi Wŏn-sŏn
- Occupation: Military person (leader)
- Spouses: Lady Sangwon; Lady Namwon
- Children: Kyŏn Hwŏn; Nŭng-ae; Yong-gae; Lady Daejudogeum; Po-gae; So-gae
- Parents: Yi Chak-jin (father); Lady Wanggyopari (mother)
- Relatives: King Jinheung of Silla (ancestor)

Korean name
- Hangul: 아자개
- Hanja: 阿玆蓋; 阿慈介; 阿慈个; 阿字蓋
- RR: Ajagae
- MR: Ajagae

Other name
- Hangul: 이원선
- Hanja: 李元善
- RR: I Wonseon
- MR: I Wŏnsŏn

Ajagae was a military and rebel leader in the Sangju area during the waning years of Unified Silla who led a local rebellion which seized Sangju and is remembered primarily as the father of Kyŏn Hwŏn, the founder and first king of Later Baekje. Some Kyŏn family lineages therefore claim him as their progenitor, although he was surnamed Yi. Ajagae was born and lived most of his life in Gaeun, in modern-day Mungyeong, where he was a farmer. According to the historical text Samguk yusa, he was descended from King Jinheung of Silla, but clearly his branch of the family had lost its royal connection some time before.

Since there is no record of interactions between Ajagae and Kyŏn Hwŏn during their later years, it is possible that Ajagae was not really Kyŏn Hwŏn's father. The records of the Later Three Kingdoms period, however, are too sparse to permit any conclusive judgment. It is equally possible that the two men became estranged after Kyŏn Hwŏn left home to join the Silla army.

== See also ==
- History of Korea
