= Queen Mungong =

Goryeo queen consort (fl. 10th century)

Queen Mungong 문공왕후

Queen consort of Goryeo
- Tenure: ?–?
- Predecessor: Queen Uihwa
- Successor: Queen Munseong
- Burial: Alleung tomb
- Spouse: Jeongjong of Goryeo
Posthumous name
- Queen Sukjeol Hyosin Gyeongsin Seonmok Sunseong Jeonghye Ansuk Mungong 숙절효신경신선목순성정혜안숙문공왕후 (淑節孝愼景信宣穆順聖貞惠安淑文恭王后)
- House: Suncheon Pak clan
- Father: Pak Yŏng-gyu
- Mother: Kyŏn Ae-bok
- Religion: Buddhism

Queen Mungong of the Suncheon Pak clan (Korean: 문공왕후 박씨; Hanja: 文恭王后 朴氏) was a Later Baekje royal family member as the second maternal granddaughter of Kyŏn Hwŏn who became a Goryeo queen consort as the first wife of King Jeongjong. She was the second sister, along with Lady Dongsanwon and Queen Munseong.

== Posthumous name ==
- In April 1002 (5th year reign of King Mokjong), name Suk-jeol (숙절; 淑節) was added.
- In March 1014 (5th year reign of King Hyeonjong), name Hyo-sin (효신; 孝愼) was added.
- In April 1027 (18th year reign of King Hyeonjong), name Gyeong-sin (경신; 景信), Seon-mok (선목; 宣穆) and Sun-seong (순성; 順聖) was added.
- In October 1056 (10th year reign of King Munjong), name Jeong-hye (정혜; 貞惠) was added.
- In October 1253 (40th year reign of King Gojong), name An-suk (안숙; 安淑) was added to her posthumous name too.

== In popular culture ==
- Portrayed by Hong Ri-na in the 2002–2003 KBS TV series The Dawn of the Empire.
