= Wang Yo =

Wang Yo may refer to:

- Wang Yo, the personal name of Jeongjong, 3rd monarch of Goryeo (923 – 949)
- Wang Yo, the personal name of Gongyang of Goryeo (1345-1394)
