= Seonsan =

Village in Gumi, South Korea

- eup
- Panoramic view of Seonsan

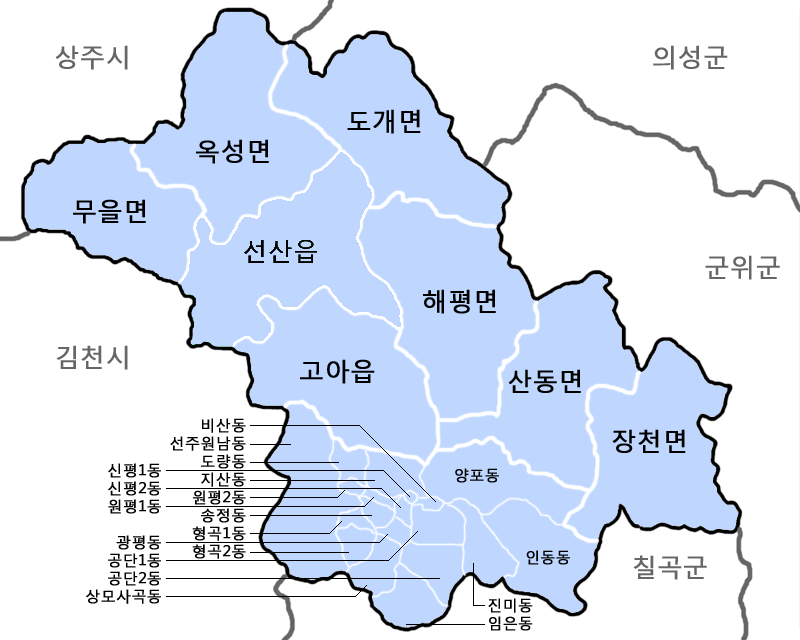

- Location within South Korea
- Coordinates: 37°02′N 127°31′E
- Country: South Korea
- Province: North Gyeongsang Province
- City: Gumi

Population (May 2022)
  - Total: Around 14,000
- Website: www.gumi.go.kr/main.do

Korean name
- Hangul: 선산읍
- Hanja: 善山邑
- RR: Seonsan-eup
- MR: Sŏnsan-ŭp

Seonsan-eup (Korean: 선산읍), is an eup or large village in Gumi, North Gyeongsang, South Korea. It has an area of 69 km^{2}. There are several historical landmarks in Seonsan, including two Joseon Dynasty schools: Geumo Seowon and the Seonsan hyanggyo. In addition, South Korean national treasure number 130, the five-storied pagoda of Jukjang-dong, is located there.

As of May 2022, the population was around 14,000. This is a marked decline from past years; in 1995, its population had been 21,385. That number dropped to 15,001 by the end of 2020, and 14,623 by the end of 2021. The population is expected to continue dropping.

== History ==
The area has been populated for over a thousand years. In 614, it was part of Silla. Seonsan was the site of the final battle between Goryeo and Later Baekje in 936, in which Later Baekje was finally defeated by the combined forces of Wang Kŏn and Kyŏn Hwŏn. It received its current name in 1413, during the early Joseon period. Around 1915, its population was around 1,000.

Seonsan was raised from myeon to eup status in 1979. Since 2004, it has been connected to the Jungbu Naeryuk Expressway.

Famous people associated with Seonsan include former South Korean president Park Chung Hee and early Joseon scholar Ha Wi-ji.

== See also ==
- Geography of South Korea
- Subdivisions of South Korea
