= Taejo Wang Geon (TV series) =

2000–2002 South Korean period drama

- Japanese release promotional image
- Hangul: 태조 왕건
- Hanja: 太祖 王建
- Lit.: Great Progenitor Wang Gun
- RR: Taejo Wang Geon
- MR: T'aejo Wang Kŏn
- Genre: Historical drama
- Written by: Lee Hwan-kyung
- Directed by: Kim Jong-sun
- Starring: Choi Soo-jong; Kim Yeong-cheol; Kim Hye-ri; Seo In-seok
- Country of origin: South Korea
- Original language: Korean
- No. of episodes: 200

Production
- Producer: KBS Production
- Running time: 50 minutes

Original release
- Network: KBS1
- Release: April 1, 2000 – February 24, 2002

Taejo Wang Geon (Korean: 태조 왕건) is a 2000 Korean historical period drama. Directed by Kim Jong-sun and starring Choi Soo-jong in the title role of King Taejo. The drama aired from April 1, 2000, to February 24, 2002, in 200 episodes. The scene dealing with the end of Gungye (the 120th episode) gained a lot of popularity, recording the highest viewership rating of 60.4% in the metropolitan area.

== Cast ==
=== Main ===
- Choi Soo-jong as King Taejo (Wang Geon)
  - Oh Hyun-chul as young Wang Geon
- Kim Yeong-cheol as Gung Ye
  - Maeng Se-chang as young Gung Ye
- Kim Hye-ri as Queen Kang Yeon Hwa
  - Jung Hoo as young Yeon Hwa
- Seo In-seok as Gyeon Hwon

=== Supporting ===
- Park Sang-ah as Empress Shin Hye of the Yoo clan, Wang Geon's first wife
- Yum Jung-ah as Empress Jang Hwa of the Oh clan, Wang Geon's second wife
- Jeon Mi-seon as Empress Shin Myung Sun Sung of the Yoo clan, Wang Geon's third wife
- Ahn Jung-hoon as Wang Mu (son of Jang Hwa, future Emperor Hyejong)
- Kim Kap-soo as Jong Gan
- Jeon Moo-song as Choi Seung Woo
- Kim In-tae as Ahjitae
- Jung Jin as Neung Whan
- Kim Sung-kyum as Ajagae
- Lee Mi-ji as Ajagae's wife
- Shin Goo as Wang Ryung, (father of Wang Gun)
- Seo Woo-rim as Wang Ryung's wife
- Kim Hyung-il as Neung San (later renamed as Shin Sung Kyum)
- Kang In-duk as Yoo Geum Pil
- Kim Hak-chul as Park Sul Hee
- Lee Kye-in as Ae Sul

=== Extended ===
- Kim Ha-kyun as Tae Pyeong
- Jung Tae-woo as Choi Eung
- Kim Myung-soo as Wang Gyu
- Jung Kook-jin as Wang Shik Ryum
- Kil Yong-woo as Bok Ji Gyum
- Lee Kwang-ki as Shin Gum (Kyun Hwon's son)
  - Kim Young-chan as young Shin Gum
- Park Sang-jo as Eun Boo
- Park Ji-young as Choi Ji Mong
- Jang Hang-sun as Wang Pyung Dal
- Tae Min-young as Shin Kang
- No Hyun-hee as Queen Jin Sung
- Choi Woon Kyo as Geum Dae (Gung Ye's subordinate general)
- Song Yong-tae as Hong Yoo (Hong Sul)
- Shin Dong-hoon as Bae Hyun Kyung
- Kim Ki-bok as Kim Rak
- Na Han-il as Byun Sa Bu ('Sa Bu' means 'master')
- Park Young-mok as Ma Sa Bu
- Jang Soon-gook as Jang Soo Jang ('Soo Jang' means 'captain' or 'leader', 'chief')
- Lee Dae-ro as Ambassador Do Sun
- Shim Woo-chang as Yeom Sang
- Lee Young-ho as Yang Gum
  - Seo Hoo as young Yang Gum
- Jun Hyun as Geum Kang
- Kang Jae-il as Chu Heo Jo
- Kim Si-won as General Soo Dal
- Seo Young-jin as Ambassador Kyung Bo
- Lee Il-woong as Oh Da Ryun
- Seo Sang-shik as Na Chong Rye
- Baek In-chul as Hwan Sun Gil
- Choi Joo-bong as Lee Heun Am
- Park Chul-ho as Ji Hwon
- Suh Yoon-jae as Ok Yi
- Im Byung-ki as Shin Deok
- Geum Bo-ra as Mrs. Park (queen consort of Gyeon-hwon)
- Jun Byung-ok as Neung Ae
- Lee Jung-woong as Gong Jik
- Im Hyuk-joo as Park Young Kyu
- Han Jung-gook as Choi Pil
- Shin Gook as Young Soon
- Choi Byung-hak as Jong Hoon
- Ki Jung-soo as Pa Dal
- Kim Joo-young as Kim Wi Hong
- Lee Byung-wook as Prince Maui
- Moon Hoe-won as King Gyeong Ae
- Shin Kwi-sik as King Gyeong Sun
- Kim Hyo-won as Kim Hyo Jong
- Yoo Byung-joon as Kim Yool
- Park Tae-min as Won Geuk Yoo
- Kim Bong-geun as Park Jil
- Min Ji-hwan as Kim Haeng Sun
- Kim Sung-ok as Kang Jang Ja ('Jang Ja' literally means 'old man', it can means 'elder')
- Park Joo-ah as Mrs. Baek
- Ahn Dae-yong as Monk Beom Gyo
- Lee Kye-young as Yoon Shin Dal
- Kang Man-hee as Jun Yi Gab
- Kwon Hyuk-ho as Jun Ui Gab
- Kim Ok-man as Geum Shik
- Kim Jin-tae as Park Yoo
- Park Sang-kyu as Kim Soon Shik
- Lee Chi-woo as Yang Gil
- Jo Jae-hoon as Im Choon Gil
- Oh Sung-yul as Ip Jun
- Jo Yong-tae as Jong Hoe
- Suh Hyun-suk as Hye Jong
- Kang In-ki as Yong Gum
- Yun Woon-kyung as royal household nanny
- Min Wook as Yoo Geung Dal
- Jo In-pyo as Kim Un
- Jang Seo-hee
- Seo Bum-shik
- Jang Jung-hee
- Kim Dong-suk
- Park Byung-ho
- Kim Won-bae
- Kim Tae-hyung

== Awards ==
2000 KBS Drama Awards

- Grand Prize (Daesang): Kim Yeong-cheol

2001 KBS Drama Awards

- Grand Prize (Daesang): Choi Soo-jong
- Top Excellence Award, Actor: Seo In-seok
- Excellence Award, Actor: Kim Kap-soo
- Excellence Award, Actress: Kim Hye-ri
- Best Supporting Actor: Jung Tae-woo
- Best New Actor: Lee Kwang-ki
- Special Award: Taejo Wang Geon Martial Arts Team

== See also ==
- Wang-geon, the Great
