= Prince Gyeongchunwon =

- Prince of Goryeo
- Died: c.960 Goryeo
- House: House of Wang
- Father: Jeongjong of Goryeo
- Mother: Queen Munseong of the Suncheon Bak clan
- Religion: Buddhism

Korean name
- Hangul: 경춘원군
- Hanja: 慶春院君
- Lit.: Prince of the Gyeongchun Courtyard
- RR: Gyeongchunwongun
- MR: Kyŏngch'unwŏn'gun

Prince Gyeongchunwon (Korean: 경춘원군; Hanja: 慶春院君; d. c.960) was a Korean Royal Prince as the only son of Jeongjong of Goryeo, from Queen Munseong, also the nephew of Gwangjong of Goryeo. Upon the death of his father on April 13 949, he was unable to succeed the throne due to his young age at the time. His uncle, King Gwangjong, succeeded in line to be the king and he was later executed by Gwangjong along with his half cousin Prince Heunghwa.

== In popular culture ==
- Portrayed by Kim Min-woo and Sung Nak-man in the 2002–2003 KBS TV series The Dawn of the Empire.

Preceded by Wang Je	Prince of Goryeo	Succeeded by Wang Ju
