= Kyeon =

- Hangul: 견
- Hanja: 甄; 堅
- RR: Gyeon
- MR: Kyŏn
- IPA: [kjʌn]

Kyeon is a Korean surname.

== Overview ==
Kyeon may be written with two different hanja characters: 甄 or 堅. The 2000 South Korean census found 1,660 people across 493 households with these surnames. In a study by the National Institute of the Korean Language based on 2007 application data for South Korean passports, it was found that a majority people with this surname spelled it in Latin letters as Kyeon in their passports.

=== 甄 ===
The Kyeon (甄) are the descendants of Kyŏn Hwŏn, the founding king of Later Baekje. The 2000 South Korean census found 1,141 people across 340 households with this surname.

=== 堅 ===
The 堅 surname has only one clan, the Cheonnyeong Kyeon clan. Their progenitor is Kyŏn Kwon (견권; 堅權), who was a general during the early Goryeo dynasty in the 10th century AD. The 2000 South Korean census found 519 people across 153 households with this surname.

== Notable people ==
- Kyeon Mi-ri (born 1965), South Korean actress
- Kyŏn Ae-bok, Korean princess
- Kyŏn Hwŏn (c. 867–936), Korean king
- Kyŏn Sin-gŏm (died 936), Korean king
