= Lady Cheongjunam =

Lady Cheongjunamwon
- Spouse: Jeongjong of Goryeo
- House: Cheongju Gim (by birth); House of Wang (by marriage)
- Father: Gim Geung-ryul
- Religion: Buddhism

Korean name
- Hangul: 청주남원부인
- Hanja: 淸州南院夫人
- RR: Cheongjunamwon buin
- MR: Ch'ŏngjunamwŏn puin

Lady Cheongjunamwon of the Cheongju Gim clan (Korean: 청주남원부인 김씨; Hanja: 淸州南院夫人 金氏; lit. 'Lady of the South Cheongju Courtyard') was the younger daughter of Gim Geung-ryul who became the third wife of King Jeongjong of Goryeo while her elder sister became Hyejong of Goryeo's 3rd wife, Lady Cheongju.

== In popular culture ==
- Portrayed by Do Ji-young in the 2002–2003 KBS TV series The Dawn of the Empire.
