= Zhen Quan =

Chinese physician

Chen Chuan was a 7th-century Chinese physician who, in 643, noted the symptoms of thirst and the sweetness of urine of diabetics.
