= Wang Sing-nyŏm =

Korean military leader (fl. 10th century)

- Hangul: 왕식렴
- Hanja: 王式廉
- RR: Wang Sikryeom
- MR: Wang Singnyŏm

Posthumous name
- Hangul: 위정
- Hanja: 威靜
- RR: Wijeong
- MR: Wijŏng

Wang Sing-nyŏm (Korean: 왕식렴; Hanja: 王式廉; ? – February 7, 949 (Note: In the Korean calendar (lunisolar), he died on the 7th day of the 1st Lunar month.)) was the younger first cousin of Taejo Wang Kŏn who served the Goryeo dynasty. He was entrusted by his cousin as the commander of the Pyongyang Regional Military Command. After Taejo's death, Wang Sing-nyom was a major factor in the succession struggles that followed, stopping Wang Kyu's attempts to enthrone his grandson, and was a strong supporter of his nephews, Wang Yo and Wang So.

== Biography ==
Wang Sing-nyom was the son of Wang P'yŏng-dal. In 918, he was appointed as the commander (대도호부사; 大都護府使) of the Pyongyang Regional Military Command. He would be promoted to junior vice councilor (좌승; 佐丞; chwasŭng).

After the death of his cousin, King Taejo, Wang Sing-nyom partnered with his nephews, Wang Yo and Wang So, in the struggles for succession. In 945, Wang Kyu, a father-in-law of both Taejo and the then reigning King Hyejong, attempted to enthrone his maternal grandson, Prince Gwangjuwon. Military forces from Pyongyang under Wang Sing-nyom's command were able to stop and eliminate Wang Kyu. He later died in February 7, 949 and was posthumously honoured with the name of Wichŏng.
