= Kyŏn Sin'gŏm =

King of Later Paekche (fl. 10th century)

King of Later Baekje
- Reign: 15 November 935 – 936
- Coronation: 15 November 935
- Predecessor: Kyŏn Hwŏn
- Successor: Dynasty abolished (Taejo of Goryeo as the first King of Goryeo)
- Died: 936; Goryeo
Era name and dates
- Jeonggae (정개; 正開): 900–936
- House: Kyŏn
- Father: Kyŏn Hwŏn
- Mother: Lady Sangwon
- Religion: Buddhism

Korean name
- Hangul: 견신검
- Hanja: 甄神劍
- RR: Gyeon Singeom
- MR: Kyŏn Sin'gŏm

Kyŏn Sin'gŏm (Korean: 견신검; Hanja: 甄神劍; ? – September 936, (Note: In the Korean calendar (lunisolar).) r. 15 November 935 – 936 (Note: In the Korean calendar (lunisolar), he reigned on 17 October 935 – September 936.)) was the second and final king of Later Baekje, one of the Later Three Kingdoms of Korea. He came to the throne after conspiring with his two brothers, Yanggŏm and Yonggŏm, to overthrow their father Kyŏn Hwŏn and kill the anointed heir, their younger half-brother Kŭmgang.

The brothers imprisoned Kyŏn Hwŏn at a monastery for three months, but he was able to escape to modern day Naju. Kyŏn Hwŏn fled to Goryeo, and submitted to Wang Geon and asked for his help to punish his sons for usurping him. Together with the Goryeo King, he led the Goryeo army against them in 936 AD at present-day Seonsan in Gumi, destroying Kyŏn Sin'gŏm's army.

King Taejo of Goryeo deemed that the plot was the work of Kyŏn Sin'gŏm's brothers, and granted Kyŏn Sin'gŏm a noble title. Accounts vary as to whether Yanggŏm and Yonggŏm were sent into exile or slain. According to historian Richard McBride, they were all executed while Sin'gŏm was spared due to his brother's testimony of Sin'gŏm's innocence.

== See also ==
- History of Korea

== Bibliography ==
- McBride, Richard (2024), The Three Kingdoms of Korea: Lost Civilizations

Kyŏn Sin'gŏm House of Kyŏn Died: 936
Regnal titles
| Preceded by Kyŏn Hwŏn | King of Later Baekje; 935–936 | Succeeded by none |
