= Later Three Kingdoms =

Period of Korean history (890s–936)

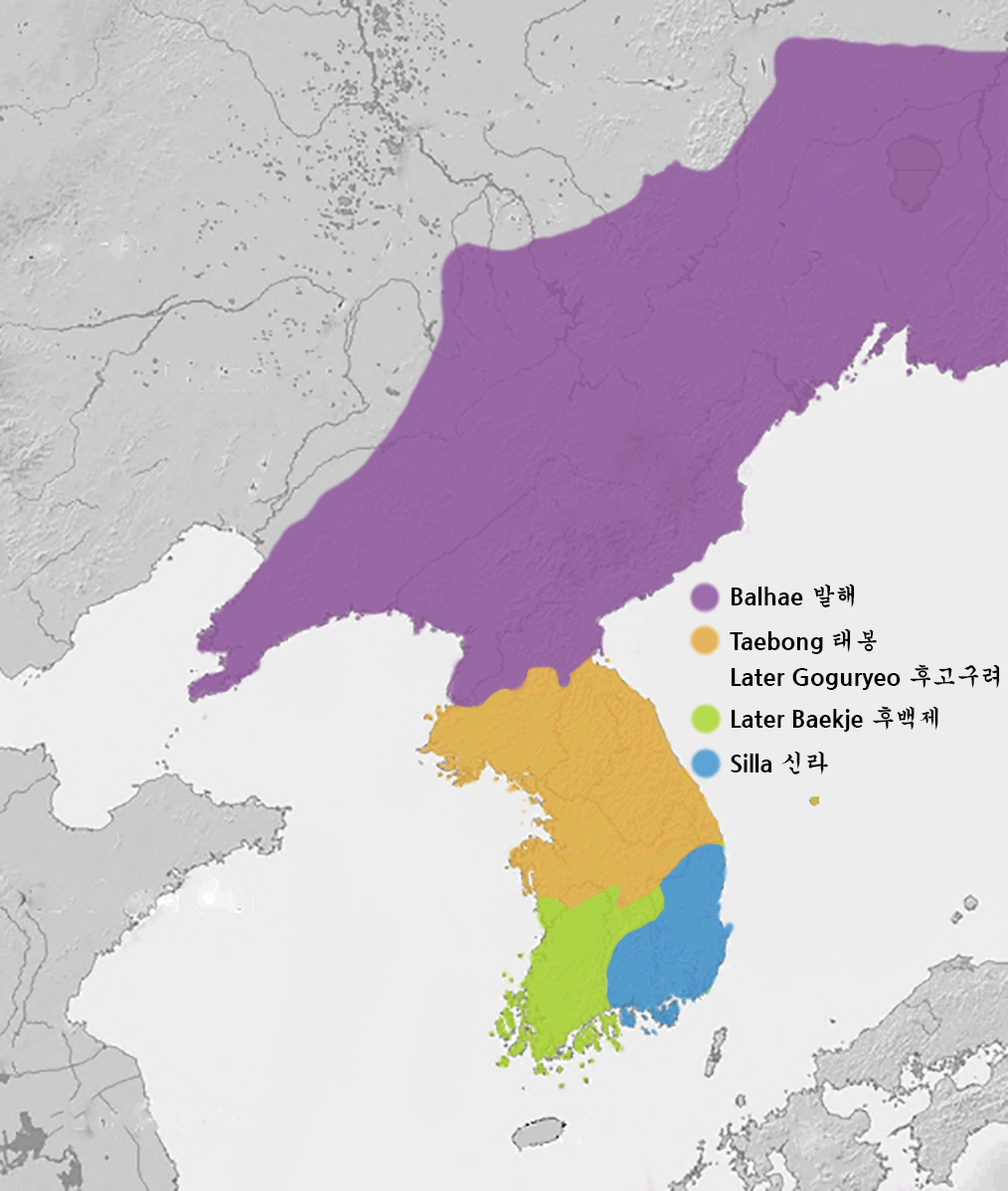

Korean name
- Hangul: 후삼국 시대
- Hanja: 後三國時代
- RR: Husamguk sidae
- MR: Husamguk sidae

The Later Three Kingdoms period (Korean: 후삼국시대; c. 890s – 936 AD) of early medieval Korea was a partial revival of the old three kingdoms, which had existed from the 1st century BC to the 7th century.

== Dates ==
The start and end dates of the Later Three Kingdoms era are loosely defined and differ across academic sources. Key events used as starting dates include the first major rebellions against Unified Silla (889), the capture of Gwangju by Kyŏn Hwŏn and subsequent establishment of the Later Baekje state at Jeonju (892), and the proclamation of Later Baekje as a kingdom by Kyŏn Hwŏn (900). Two events mark the end of the Later Three Kingdoms: the surrender of Gyeongsun, the last Silla monarch, to Goryeo in 935 and the conquest of Later Baekje by Goryeo in 936.

== See also ==
- List of monarchs of Korea
- Taejo of Goryeo
- Taejo Wang Geon (TV series)
- Tomb of King Wanggon
- Family tree of the Goryeo kings
- Silla monarchs family tree

== Notes ==
Most of this article has been copied from here: https://www.worldhistory.org/Later_Three_Kingdoms_Period/
