= Jeongjong, 3rd monarch of Goryeo =

King of Goryeo from 945 to 949

Jeongjong 정종 定宗

King of Goryeo
- Reign: 23 October 945 – 13 April 949
- Coronation: 945; Gaegyeong, Goryeo
- Predecessor: Hyejong of Goryeo
- Successor: Gwangjong of Goryeo
- Born: Wang Yo; 923; Gaegyeong, State of Goryeo, Three Kingdoms of Korea
- Died: 13 April 949 (aged 25–26); Jeseok-won, Gaegyeong, Goryeo
- Burial: Alleung (안릉; 安陵)
- Queen Consort: Queen Mungong; Queen Munseong
- Consort: Lady Cheongjunamwon
- Issue: Prince Gyeongchunwon; Princess Wang
Posthumous name
- Great King Jideok Janggyeong Jeongsuk Munmyeong (지덕장경정숙문명대왕, 至德章敬正肅文明大王; original); Great King Jangwon Gangyeong Yeongin Jeongsuk Janggyeong Munmyeong (장원간경영인정숙장경문명대왕, 莊元簡敬令仁正肅章敬文明大王; final)
Temple name
- Jeongjong (정종; 定宗)
- House: Wang
- Dynasty: Goryeo
- Father: Taejo of Goryeo
- Mother: Queen Sinmyeong
- Religion: Buddhism

Korean name
- Hangul: 왕요
- Hanja: 王堯
- RR: Wang Yo
- MR: Wang Yo

Monarch name
- Hangul: 정종
- Hanja: 定宗
- RR: Jeongjong
- MR: Chŏngjong

Courtesy name
- Hangul: 천의
- Hanja: 天義
- RR: Cheonui
- MR: Ch'ŏnŭi

Posthumous name
- Hangul: 문명대왕
- Hanja: 文明大王
- RR: Munmyeong daewang
- MR: Munmyŏng taewang

Jeongjong (Korean: 정종; Hanja: 定宗; 923 – 13 April 949), personal name Wang Yo, was the third king of the Goryeo dynasty of Korea. He was the third son of King Taejo, the dynastic founder.

== Reign ==
Jeongjong rose to the throne after his half-brother King Hyejong died, and set himself to reducing the power of various royal in-laws, including Wang Gyu and Pak Sul-hui. However, lacking the support of the Gaegyeong elites, he was unable to substantially strengthen the throne.

In 946, he spent 70,000 sacks of grain from the royal storehouses to support Buddhism in the country. In 947, he had the fortress of Pyongyang constructed as the country's Western Capital. He sought to move the capital from Gaegyeong to Pyongyang as his father had desired, as Jeongjong believed that in order to restore Goguryeo's old territories, the capital should be moved further north. However, Jeongjong was not successful in his attempts due to opposition from the nobility based in Gaegyeong.

Jeongjong became paranoid however that people inside the palace were conspiring to kill him and he then started to go insane. After four years of his reign, he died just after he signed a royal decree to make his brother, the fourth prince Wang So (known as Gwangjong), king instead of his son.

== Family ==
- Father: Taejo of Goryeo
  - Grandfather: Wang Ryung, King Wimu the Great
  - Grandmother: Queen Wisuk of the Han clan
- Mother: Queen Sinmyeong of the Chungju Yu clan
  - Grandfather: Yu Kŭngdal
- Consorts and their Respective Issue(s):
1. Queen Mungong of the Suncheon Pak clan – No issue.
2. Queen Munseong of the Suncheon Pak clan
  1. Prince Gyeongchunwon, 1st son
  2. 1st daughter
3. Lady Cheongjunamwon of the Cheongju Kim clan – No issue.

== In popular culture ==
- Portrayed by Kim Young-chan in the 2000–2002 KBS1 TV series Taejo Wang Geon
- Portrayed by Choi Jae-sung in the 2002–2003 KBS TV series The Dawn of the Empire.
- Portrayed by Ryu Seung-soo in the 2015 MBC TV series Shine or Go Crazy.
- Portrayed by Hong Jong-hyun in the 2016 SBS TV series Moon Lovers: Scarlet Heart Ryeo.
- Portrayed by Lee Dong-wook in the 2016 tvN TV series Guardian: The Lonely and Great God.

== See also ==
- List of Korean monarchs
- Jeongjong, 10th Monarch of Goryeo

Jeongjong, 3rd monarch of Goryeo House of Wang Born: 923 Died: 13 April 949
Regnal titles
Preceded by Hyejong	King of Goryeo; 945–949	Succeeded by Gwangjong
