= Kyŏn Hwŏn =

King of Later Baekje (r. 892–935)

King of Later Baekje
- Reign: 892 – 935
- Coronation: 900
- Predecessor: Dynasty founder
- Successor: Kyŏn Sin-gŏm
- Born: c. 867; Gaeun, Sabeol, Silla
- Died: 27 September 936 (aged about 69); Hwangsan, Ungcheon, Goryeo
- Burial: Nonsan
Era name and dates
- Jeonggae (정개; 正開): 900–936
- House: House of Kyŏn (Hwanggan Kyŏn clan)
- Father: Ajagae
- Mother: Lady Sangwon
- Religion: Buddhism

Korean name
- Hangul: 견훤
- Hanja: 甄萱
- RR: Gyeon Hwon
- MR: Kyŏn Hwŏn

Other name
- Hangul: 진훤
- Hanja: 眞萱
- RR: Jin Hwon
- MR: Chin Hwŏn

Kyŏn Hwŏn (Korean: 견훤; Hanja: 甄萱; c.867 – 27 September 936, (Note: In the Korean calendar (lunisolar), he died on 9 September 936.) ruled from 892 – March 935 (Note: In the Korean calendar (lunisolar).)) was the king and founder of Later Baekje, one of the Later Three Kingdoms of Korea, and reigned from 892 to 935. Some records render his name as Chin Hwŏn (진훤; 眞萱). He was also the progenitor of the Hwanggan Kyŏn clan. Substantial accounts of his life are preserved in the Samguk sagi, which presents a single narrative, and the Samguk yusa, which presents excerpts about him from various sources.

== Background ==
Records say that Kyŏn Hwŏn was born with the surname Yi, not Kyŏn. Most accounts agree that Kyŏn Hwŏn's father was Ajagae, a farmer and rebel leader surnamed Yi, and that he was born in what is today Gaeun-eup in Mungyeong, South Korea, as the oldest of six children. However, Kyŏn Hwŏn later changed his family name to Kyon. Some argue that he changed his surname to start afresh as the founder of the new state of Later Baekje. Kyŏn Hwŏn is considered the progenitor of the Hwanggan Kyŏn clan. His sons, Sin-gŏm, Yang-gŏm, Yong-gŏm and Kŭm-gang, used the surname Kyŏn (or Chin), not Yi.

His mother was from the Gwangju area, but her exact identity is not known; Ajagae had two wives, Lady Sangwon and Lady Namwon, and Kyŏn Hwŏn was born to his first wife. Legends state that his mother was from Gwangju and gave birth to her firstborn son after having physical contact with a worm disguised as a man, and that Kyŏn Hwŏn grew up drinking the milk of a tiger.

The Silla court of Queen Jinseong was heavily corrupt and embroiled with political confusion. Widespread famine ravaged the country, driving many of the people into rebel forces. Village headmen, and new military forces arose and created power bases all over the country. The government who had tried to implement a forceful taxation plan found itself in the face of rebellions led by bandits, local nobles, and rebel leaders. It was during this time that Kyŏn Hwŏn's father Ajagae led a local peasant revolt and set up base in Sangju.

== Early life and founding of Later Baekje ==
Kyŏn Hwŏn is said to have left home at 15 to join the Silla army and became the commander of Silla forces in the Jeolla region. While his father grabbed power in the Sangju region, he independently marshalled local peasants to his cause, and soon gathered many followers. In 892, Kyŏn Hwŏn seized the cities of Wansanju and Mujinju, taking over the old territory of Baekje and winning the support of the people in the area who were hostile to Silla.

Kyŏn Hwŏn declared himself the king of Later Baekje and established his capital at Wansanju in 900. According to the Samguk Sagi, Kyŏn Hwŏn wanted to avenge Baekje’s destruction by the Silla-Tang allied forces in 660 AD, stating, “Kim Yu-sin of Silla swept through from Hwangsan to Sabi and destroyed Baekje together with the Tang army; so how could I not now establish a capital in Wansan to avenge the long-standing wrath of King Uija?” He established the Later Baekje government, made diplomatic ties with Tang China, and continuously pursued the expansion of his kingdom amidst much conflict with Kung Ye of Later Goguryeo.

== Reign ==
After crowning himself as ruler of Later Baekje, in the autumn of 901 Kyŏn Hwŏn sent his army to Taeya Fortress, present-day Hapcheon, southwest of the Silla capital Gyeongju, but the campaign failed and the army retreated. In 909, Kung Ye attacked Later Baekje by dispatching a naval force to conquer Chindo commandery in southwestern Korea. Then in 910, when Wang Kŏn, the general of the rival kingdom of Majin, attacked and captured the city of Naju, the very city in which Kyŏn Hwŏn had started his rebellion, he made an attempt to retake the city from Wang by laying siege to it for ten days but retreated after Kungye dispatched his navy to attack. In 916, Kyŏn once again laid siege to Taeya Fortress but failed to take it.

In 918, Kung Ye, who had been maintaining his rule by acts of terror, was dethroned and murdered by his own army commanders. His general and chief minister Wang Kŏn was crowned as their new ruler, marking the beginning point of Goryeo.

Kyŏn Hwŏn sent another major expedition to Taeya Fortress in 920, and continued his offensive southward and planned to siege Chillye Fortress, near modern day Gimhae. This offensive caused King Gyeongmyeong to send an emissary to Koryo, begging for assistance. Then Kyŏn invaded the present-day Andong area, but his troops were defeated by local Silla guards. Kyŏn Hwŏn was forced to make peace with Goryeo after the battle, through a hostage exchange of royal family members. However, when his nephew Chin Ho died in 926, he killed the Goryeo hostage Wang Shin, cousin of Wang Kon, and resumed war against Goryeo. He led a punitive expedition against Goryeo, but the invasion stalled and Goryeo went on the offensive with the aid of Silla in January 927.

In 927, Kyŏn Hwŏn led his army himself and directly attacked the Silla capital of Gyeongju. King Gyeongae was unprepared for this attack, and the Sillan king was captured by the army of Later Baekje. Many members of the Sillan royal court were also captured and Kyŏn's army sacked the city. Kyŏn forced the Sillan King to commit suicde, raped Gyeongae's primary consort, and permitted his underlings to sexually assault the Sillan royal concubines. He then enthroned Gyeongsun of Silla to break Silla's allaince with Goryeo.

On his way back, he was met by the forces led by Wang Kŏn, and easily defeated the Goryeo army, killing many of Wang's notable generals and warriors, with Wang barely escaping through the daring self-sacrifice of his general Sin Sung-gyŏm and Kim Nak. One year later he took over the city of Jinju from Silla. In 929, Kyŏn Hwŏn led his armies and crossed the Nakdong River and destroyed Later Sabeol, which was a short-lived state founded by Sillan Prince Pak Ŏn-ch'ang.

== Decline and fall ==
Later Baekje and Goryeo were in constant state of hostilities without one being completely dominant over the other. However, in 930, the Later Baekje troops faced a heavy defeat at the Battle of Gochang (present-day Andong) and was unable to recover from the loss. Kyŏn Hwŏn attempted to reverse the current by sacking the Goryeo capital of Gaeseong, but his army suffered another defeat in 934.

Not only was Later Baekje reeling from military defeats, the kingdom was in internal disarray. In 935, Kyŏn Hwŏn's eldest son Kyŏn Sin-gŏm, who had been slighted as heir to the throne in favor of his younger brother Kŭm-gang, overthrew Kyŏn Hwŏn with the aid of his brothers Yang-gŏm and Yong-gŏm. Sin-gŏm killed Kŭm-gang and confined Kyŏn Hwŏn to the temple Geumsansa, but Kyŏn Hwŏn escaped and fled to Goryeo and his old enemy Wang Kŏn, who welcomed him and provided him with land and slaves.

King Gyeongsun of Silla formally surrendered to Goryeo in 935. The following year, at Kyŏn Hwŏn's request, he and Wang Kŏn led a massive Goryeo army to Later Baekje and the kingdom fell. Yang-gŏm and Yong-gŏm were both executed but Sin-gŏm was spared as he had been coerced into dethroning his father.

Kyŏn Hwŏn died the same year of an inflamed tumor.

== Legacy ==
Kyŏn's historical reputation after his death has largely been negative. Almost all existing records about him are found in the Samguk Sagi while a few excerpts are found in the Samguk Yusa. The Samguk Sagi was written by Kim Bu-sik, a Goryeo era scholar descended from the Sillan royal family, whose work historians have noted has a pro-Silla bias. In it, Kim, depicts him negatively and criticizes his sack of Silla's capital as well as his brutality and mocks Kyŏn's eventual usurption by his son. These views continued during the Joseon dynasty, and even modern scholars such as Richard McBride write in detail of Kyŏn's horrific crimes.

Despite this, his descendents through his daughter Lady Kuktae eventually married into the Goryeo royal family. His granddaughters, Queen Munseong and Queen Mungong were wives of Jeongjong of Goryeo.

== Diplomacy ==
Unlike his rival Kung Ye, Kyŏn Hwŏn was active in diplomacy; he was formally confirmed by the Chinese kingdoms of Wuyue and Later Tang as the legitimate ruler of Later Baekje. In addition, he sought an alliance with the newly formed and rising Liao dynasty in the north, which was founded by the Khitans, in order to surround Goryeo from both north and south, respectively. Kyŏn Hwŏn also sent envoys to Heian Japan during his reign for mainly commercial reasons; the Jeolla region, where Kyŏn Hwŏn began his kingdom, was the center of trade in East Asia during the period and had already served as the base for traders such as Chang Pogo.

However, despite all of his diplomatic, military and trade abilities Kyŏn Hwŏn lacked the political astuteness to found a viable state; his Later Baekje government system was not very much different from the one of Silla, which had been proven to be ineffective in centralizing the power of the local landlords and merchants. In the end, Later Baekje was not able to exercise influence over many of its people, paving the way for Goryeo to incorporate the kingdom and unify the Korean peninsula.

== Wives and children ==
=== According to the Samguk sagi ===
==== Wives ====
- Unnamed primary wife
- Concubine: Lady Gobi (고비녀; 古比女)

==== Children ====
- 1st son Kyŏn Sin-gŏm (885–936)
- 2nd son Kyŏn Yang-gŏm (견양검; 甄良劍; d. 936)
- 3rd son Kyŏn Yong-gŏm (견용검; 甄龍劍; d. 936)
- 4th son Kyŏn Kŭm-gang (견금강; 甄金剛; d. 935)
- 8th son Kyŏn Nŭng-ye (견능예; 甄能乂)
- 1st daughter Kyŏn Ae-bok

=== According to the Samguk yusa ===
==== Wife ====
- Lady Sangwon of the Pak clan (상원부인 박씨; 上院夫人 朴氏)

==== Children ====
- 1st son Chin Song (진성; 眞成)
- 2nd son Chin Kyom-noe (진겸뇌; 眞謙腦)
- 3rd son Chin Yong-sul (진용술; 眞龍述)
- 4th son Chin Ch'ong-chi (진총지; 眞聰智)
- 5th son Chin Chong-u (진종우; 眞宗祐)
- 7th son Chin Wi-hung (진위흥; 眞位興)
- 8th son Chin Ch'ong-gu (진청구; 眞靑丘)
- 1st daughter Lady Kuktae (국대부인 진씨; 國大夫人 眞氏)

== See also ==
- Later Baekje
- Kung Ye
- Wang Kon
- Later Three Kingdoms
- History of Korea

== Bibliography ==
- McBride, Richard (2024), The Three Kingdoms of Korea: Lost Civilizations

Kyŏn Hwŏn House of Kyŏn Died: 936
Regnal titles
Preceded by none	King of Later Baekje; 900–935	Succeeded by Kyŏn Singŏm
Titles in pretence
Preceded by Buyeo Pung	— TITULAR — King of Baekje; Baekje claimant 900–935; Reason for succession failure: Later Three Kingdoms	Succeeded by Kyŏn Singŏm
