= Later Paekche =

Korean kingdom (892–936)

- 892–936
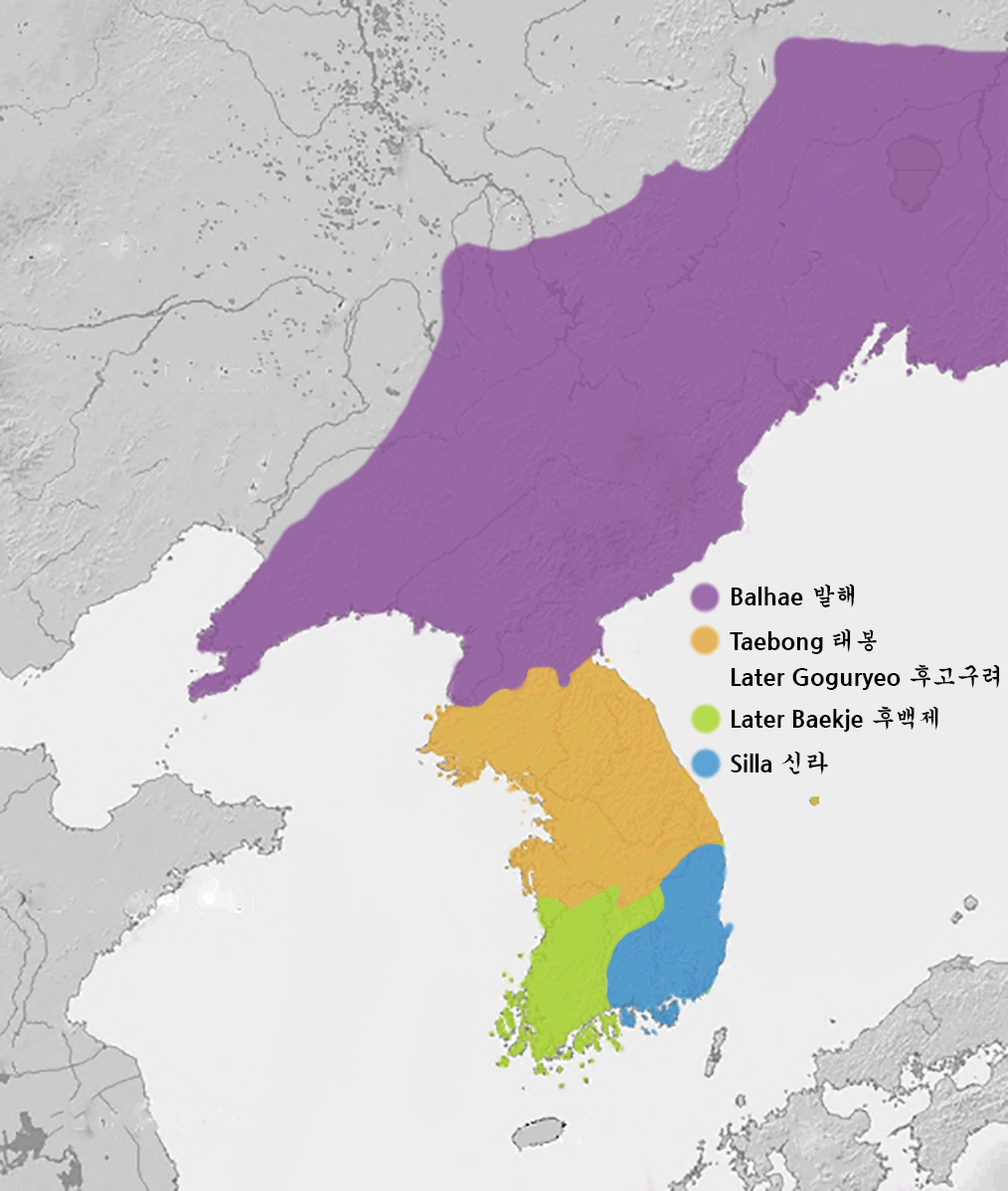
- Later Paekche (in green) in 915
- Capital: Wansanju
- Common languages: Old Korean, Classical Chinese (literary)
- Religion: Buddhism, Confucianism, Taoism, Shamanism
- Government: Monarchy
- King
  - 892–935: Kyŏn Hwŏn (first)
  - 935–936: Kyŏn Sin-gŏm (last)
- History
  - Establishment: 892
  - Fall: 936
Preceded by	Succeeded by
Unified Silla	Goryeo Dynasty
- Today part of: South Korea

Korean name
- Hangul: 후백제
- Hanja: 後百濟
- RR: Hubaekje
- MR: Hubaekche
- IPA: [ɸu.bɛk̚.t͈ɕe]

Later Paekche or Later Baekje (Korean: 후백제; Hanja: 後百濟) was one of the Later Three Kingdoms of Korea, along with Taebong and Silla. Later Paekche was a Korean dynastic kingdom founded by the disaffected Silla general Kyŏn Hwŏn in 900, whom led the local gentry and populace that were in large Paekche descent holding onto their collective consciousness until the twilight days of Later Silla. With the former Silla general declaring the revival of the Paekche kingdom of old, the Paekche refugees from the old territories and a portion of the Rank Six Nobility from Silla seeking the opportunity of rising up the ranks gathered under his leadership. Led by the charismatic and capable Kyŏn Hwŏn who was also a competent field commander, Later Paekche in its early days was advantageous in the power game against the newly found kingdom Goryeo and the declining Silla. However, despite its fertile territories in the Jeolla Province and capable military prowess, it eventually fell to Wang Kŏn's Goryeo army in 936 due to political strife and Kyŏn Hwŏn's defection towards Goryeo. Its capital was at Jeonju, in present-day North Jeolla province.

== Background ==
=== Paekche refugees of Later Silla ===
With Silla defeating the Tang Dynasty during the Silla-Tang Wars and finalizing the unification of the Three Kingdoms, an opportunity was provided for the culture of the three kingdoms to converge and for the residents to be integrated. When it came to Paekche, the vast majority of its populace including the ruling class was admitted to the polities of Silla onwards. However, Later Silla adhered to its Bone-Rank System that was highly exclusive towards the Goguryeo and Paekche refugees. In the case for those that came from Paekche, the discriminatory treatment was more severe. This was due to the fact that Paekche people resisted against Silla during its revival movement from 660 to 663. After the revival movement, Paekche refugees that were cooperative to the Silla government joined the ranks of the Nine Legions as part of the Blue and White Legion; fighting the Tang armies during the Silla-Tang Wars. Some, portion of the former royals and nobles of Paekche, were granted titles and positions by Munmu of Silla himself. However, despite these measures, there was a limit to embracing the people of Paekche by Silla when it came to fully integrating them.

Many of the former Paekche ruling class became ordinary people after the fall of Paekche. As evidenced by this, the Eight Great Families of Paekche was lost to history with many of them discarding their surnames. Though some were awarded, hence granted prestigious titles by Silla, the prizes that were bestowed upon them was far lesser of the old status back in Paekche. The Paekche people and that of their descendants' political success was bound to be limited. This eventually led to the dissatisfaction of the residents of the former Paekche region and the perception that they were in fact descendants of Paekche residents as a whole; holding an antipathic attitude against the Silla and preserving their collective consciousness.

=== Decline of Later Silla ===
After the Unification of the Three Kingdoms, Later Silla reigned as an powerhouse in the Eastern World, enjoying its heyday of more than 220 years. However, as it proceeded to decline, the local gentries across the country known as hojok began to have a desire to revolt, feeling that the central government's control over the provinces it held gradually weakened due to the endless struggle for the throne amongst the True Bone-class nobility.

In the era of Queen Jinseong (887-897), the newly crowned queen of Silla, collected taxes were not efficient due to Silla's weakened grip over its territories beyond its capital and the vicinity of it. Thus, officials were sent by the central government to urge the peasants and farmers across the country to have their taxes paid, infuriating them in the process. What came after were a series of rebellion with the Rebellion of Wŏnjong and Aeno in the Sabeol Province being the most famous of them. Though the rebellion led by Wonjong and Aeno (889) was put down to an end by Silla's army, it signaled the beginning of the Later Three Kingdoms period that was to severely weaken Silla in the following years.

When it began with his attack on Mujinju in 892, Kyŏn Hwŏn's rebellion was only one among numerous rebellions which sprouted up against the weak Silla rulers in the late 9th century. Many of these rebellions were initially triggered by the Silla decision to use force to collect taxes on the peasantry in 889 (Lee, 1984, p. 98). At this time most of the power on the peninsula was held by local gentry, who lacked strong loyalty to the central government. It was thus fairly easy for rebellions led by disaffected military officials to gain steam.

=== Rise to Power ===
Kyŏn Hwŏn, who was originally a military officer in Silla, was deployed in the southwest sea (South Jeolla Province) to wipe out pirates. However, his course of thinking that Silla was gradually declining resulted in his revolt in Mujinju (today's Gwangju) in 892. The Samguk-sagi records as many as 5,000 people participating in his revolt. Kyŏn Hwŏn would march his army to occupy Mujinju and Wansanju (Jeonju). Afterwards, he ruled the area and internally referred to himself as the King of Paekche in 900. Having the country named (Later) Paekche was part of his plan to establish the state as an authentic successor to the ancient kingdom of Paekche, which dominated the southwestern part of the Korean Peninsula until it was conquered by Silla in 660. Additionally, Kyŏn Hwŏn having the country named after the old kingdom was with the justification of solving Uija's long-cherished grudge towards Silla and inheriting the old kingdom itself. These measures were advantageous in the sense of gaining support from the Paekche refugees living in the area and rationalizing the rebellion against Silla above all else. The capital was later moved to Wansanju (now Jeonju) as well, which was closer to the central realms of old Paekche. According to the Samguk Sagi, Kyŏn Hwŏn stated, “Kim Yu-sin of Silla swept through from Hwangsan to Sabi and destroyed Baekje together with the Tang army; so how could I not now establish a capital in Wansan to avenge the long-standing wrath of King Uija?” Government offices were established in various parts of the country from this point on.

Afterwards, envoys were sent to Wuyue across the sea to establish diplomatic relations while territorial expansion policies were being implemented to subdue local gentries and independent castellans beyond. The confrontation with Taebong, the northern counterpart of the Later Three Kingdoms founded by Kung Ye and the Goguryeo refugees, would begin when both states confronted each other in the Ungju province (now South Chungcheong Province).

== Internal affairs ==
For all but the last year of its existence, Later Paekche was ruled by Kyŏn Hwŏn, and his personal style of rule played a key role in the kingdom's fate.

After declaring himself king, Kyŏn Hwŏn took numerous wives, and is said to have had 10 sons by them in addition to the eight born by his first wife. This laid the groundwork for the strife which ended the kingdom's existence.

In 935, Kyŏn Hwŏn chose his fourth son Kŭm-gang over the elder sons as the crown prince of Later Paekche. At this the eldest son, Kyŏn Sin-gŏm, conspiring with his brothers, had his father confined to Geumsansa in Gimje. Kyŏn Sin-gŏm killed Crown Prince Kŭm-gang and took the throne for himself. However, Kyŏn Hwŏn escaped to Goryeo.

== Military affairs ==
For much of its existence, Later Paekche was troubled by Wang Kŏn's naval raids in Naju region. These worked to disrupt trade and diplomatic ties with Southern Chinese kingdoms.

Later Paekche possessed considerable military strength. South Korean historian Ki-baik Lee writes of Kyŏn Hwŏn that "Had Kungye and Wang Kŏn not stood in his way, he surely would have had little difficulty in toppling Silla." Later Paekche showed its greatest strength in 927. In that year its armies attacked and pillaged the Silla capital at Gyeongju, slaying King Gyeongae and establishing King Gyeongsun as the ruler. Before the attack, Silla had sent for aid from Goryeo, and Wang Kŏn arrived with a large army shortly after Gyeongju was taken. The two armies met near Palgong Mountain in present-day Daegu. Wang Kŏn's forces in the battle reportedly numbered 10,000 men. Later Baekje triumphed, and Wang Kŏn himself only escaped through the daring self-sacrifice of his general Sin Sunggyŏm and Kim Nak.

However, when the two armies met again at the Battle of Gochang near Andong in 930, Goryeo scored a decisive victory. Later Paekche was pushed back into its heartland, and there suffered a further crippling defeat at Hongseong in 934.

== Diplomatic ties ==
As Wang Kon sought to maintain legitimacy through diplomatic ties with northern China, Kyŏn Hwŏn strove to do the same by maintaining ties with the rulers of southern China, particularly Wuyue. However, because Later Baekje's existence largely coincided with the turbulent Five Dynasties and Ten Kingdoms period in China, neither side was able to parlay these ties into military support.

== Fall ==
After he was deposed by his sons in 935 and fled to Goryeo, Kyŏn Hwŏn himself came to lead the armies against Later Paekche. Together with Wang Kŏn, the Samguk Yusa reports that he led an army of 100,000 against his former kingdom. The Goryeo and Later Paekche armies met at Seonsan, today part of Gumi in North Gyeongsang province, and the Later Paekche forces were destroyed. Later Paekche thus finally fell in 936, one year after King Gyeongsun had surrendered Silla to Wang Kŏn. The battle of Seonsan thus marked the end of the Later Three Kingdoms period.

In his own characteristically open-handed style, Wang Kŏn conferred a title upon the defeated leader Sin-gŏm. Sin-gŏm's younger brothers Yang-gŏm and Yong-gŏm, who were judged to have been to blame for the coup d'etat, were sent into exile.

== See also ==
- History of Korea
