= Choi Ji-mong =

Goryeo official (907–987)

- 최지몽

Director of the Secretariat
- In office 982–987
- Appointed by: Taejo of Goryeo
- Preceded by: unknown
- Succeeded by: unknown

Personal details
- Born: 907 Silla, Yeongam County
- Died: 2 April 987 Goryeo, Gaesong
- Parent: Father Choi Heun
- Occupation: Politician
- Profession: Astronomer, Cosmologist, Diviner

Choi Ji-mong (Korean: 최지몽; 907–987) was an astronomer, diviner, and high-level civil servant of Goryeo who served from the reign of Taejo of Goryeo to that of Seongjong of Goryeo. He predicted through astrology that Wang Gun would unify the Later Three Kingdoms into one country.

== Life ==
He was born in Yeongam County in 907, during the Later Three Kingdoms period. He was from the Nangju Choi Clan, and his original name was Choi Chung-jin (Korean: 최총진). His father, Choe Heun (Korean: 최흔), or Choe Sang-heun (Korean: 최상흔), was the head of a powerful local gentry family based in Nangju, Jeolla Province. He learned from scholars such as Daegwang Hyeon-il and Hyeongmi Seonsa. He also researched astrology and cosmology in nearby Wolchulsan. He also studied Confucianism during his youth.

At the age of 18, he was appointed by Taejo of Goryeo, who thought highly of Choi's knowledge of astrology and cosmology. Wang Gun personally brought Ji-mong to Gaeseong to interpret his dream of ascending to the ninth floor of Hwangnyongsa. Ji-mong interpreted Wang's dream as a prediction that Wang Gun would unify the Korean Peninsula in the future. Taejo gave Choi the new name Ji-mong, which means "diviner" in Hanja. His first role was as an officer of the Bureau of Royal Decrees. His career was closely associated with the founding of Goryeo under Wang Gun. He was an advisor to Wang Gun during many of his battles and clashes with Later Baekje. After Goryeo unified Later Baekje and Later Silla, Choi continued to work as a political advisor to the king of Goryeo.

When Hyejong of Goryeo came to the throne, there was a rebellion by Prince Gwangjuwon. Wang Gyu, who wanted to become king of Goryeo, chose to assassinate Hyejong. However, the assassination was unsuccessful, as Choi predicted through his knowledge of astrology that there would be a rebellion, and he advised Hyejong to leave the palace. He served as an advisor to Hyejong and Jeongjong of Goryeo.

His political career was in danger during the reign of Gwangjong of Goryeo, when he made mistakes in etiquette toward the king during a ceremony held at Gwibeopsa, a Buddhist temple in the capital of Goryeo, Gaeseong. He left office and was banished for 11 years. When Gyeongjong of Goryeo came to the throne in 975, Choi was appointed as Daekwang, a senior officer position.

His knowledge of astrology and cosmology again helped prevent a rebellion attempt by Wang Seung, a collateral prince of the Gaeseong Wang clan. Seongjong appointed Choi as Director of the Secretariat in 982.

Choi retired at the age of 81, after several requests to retire were rejected by the king of Goryeo. He died on 2 April 987, in Gaeseong. Seongjong posthumously conferred on Choi the title of Grand Tutor to the Crown Prince.

== In post-classical tradition ==
Television

Choi Ji-mong has appeared in several television series. In Taejo Wang Geon (2000–2002), one of the best-known television series in South Korea, Choi Ji-mong was played by Gianni Park. In another television series, The Dawn of the Empire (2002–2003), Jung Dong-hwan took on the role of Choi Ji-mong. In Empress Cheonchu, a television series produced in 2009, Jeon Seong-hwan played Choi Ji-mong. In 2015, Kim Byeong-ok played Choi Ji-mong in Shine or Go Crazy.

In 2016, Kim Sung-kyun portrayed Choi Ji-mong in the series Moon Lovers: Scarlet Heart Ryeo.
