= Gangneung Kim clan =

Korean clan from Gangwon Province

- Country: Korea
- Current region: Gangneung, Gangwon Province, South Korea
- Founder: Kim Chu-wŏn
- Website: gnkim.kr

The Gangneung Kim clan (Korean: 강릉 김씨; Hanja: 江陵 金氏) is a Korean clan, with the bon-gwan (ancestral seat) based in Gangneung, Gangwon Province, South Korea.

== Background ==
The progenitor of the clan is considered to be Kim Chu-wŏn. Kim Chu-wŏn was the relative of Hyegong of Silla and the rightful heir to the throne. However, as Kim did not reside in the capital of Gyeongju, he needed to cross the Alcheon River (modern-day Bukcheon stream) to be proclaimed king after death of King Seondeok of Silla. Due to heavy rainfall, the river was flooded and Kim Chu-wŏn could not cross and make it to the capital. The nobles of Gyeongju instead picked Kim Kyŏng-sin to be the new king. Kim Chu-wŏn was compensated by being enfeoffed as the Prince of Myŏngju (modern-day Gangneung).

As a part of the Silla royalty, they were true bone caste in Silla's bone-rank system. In 822, Kim Chu-wŏn's son, Kim Hŏn-ch'ang, rebelled against the Silla government and attempted to create his own kingdom of Jangan, based in Ungju. Kim Hŏn-ch'ang was defeated and he committed suicide to avoid capture. 239 of his relatives were killed. His son, Kim Pŏm-mun, also attempted a rebellion against Silla 3 years later at Hansan near Seoul, but he too failed.

A majority of the clan is descended from Kim Chu-wŏn's third son, Kim Sin (김신; 金身) who chose to stay in Gangneung. The Gangneung Kims still residing in Gangneung would become the regional lords or hojoks of Gangneung, taking advantage of their true bone status. They were key supporters of Wang Kŏn, with individuals such as Kim Ye and Kim Sun-sik contributing to the founding of Goryeo. The grateful Wang Kŏn granted a branch of the Gangneung Kim clan with his own surname of Wang, who were known as the Gangneung Wang clan. During the early Goryeo period from 981 to 1146, they produced nine government officials, five of whom were high officials, making them the clan with the fifth most officials produced in this timeframe.

In the 2015 South Korean census, 179,593 individuals who were members of the Gangneung Kim clan.

== Members ==
- Kim Chu-wŏn, Silla royal family member
- Kim Hŏn-ch'ang (died 822), Korean aristocrat and rebel
- Kim Yang (808–857), Silla government official
- Kim Ye (aristocrat), Gangneung regional lord
- Kim Si-sŭp (1435–1493), Joseon scholar-official
- Yi Sang (born Kim Hae-gyeong, 1910–1937), Korean poet and author
- Kim Moon-ki (1932–2021), South Korean politician
- Kim Jin-sun (born 1946), South Korean politician
- Anatoli Kim (born 1939), Russian-Korean writer
- Kim Nam-il (born 1977), South Korean football player
- Kim Rae-won (born 1981), South Korean actor
- Kim Ji-min (comedian)(jiminlop)(born 1984)South Korean comedian
- Kim Go-eun (born 1991), South Korean actor
- RM (musician) (born Kim Nam-joon, 1994), South Korean musician, member of boy band BTS

== See also ==
- Kim (Korean surname)
