= Lady Gwangjuwon =

Royal consort of Goryeo
- Predecessor: Lady Daemyeongjuwon
- Successor: Lady Sogwangjuwon
- Born: Unknown; Gwangju, Gyeonggi
- Died: Unknown; Gwangju, Gyeonggi
- Spouse: Taejo of Goryeo
- House: Yanggeun Ham or Wang? (by birth); House of Wang (by marriage)
- Father: Wang-Gyu (왕규)
- Religion: Buddhism

Korean name
- Hangul: 광주원부인
- Hanja: 廣州院夫人
- Lit.: Lady of the Gwangju Courtyard
- RR: Gwangjuwon buin
- MR: Kwangjuwŏn puin

Lady Gwangjuwon of the Wang clan (Korean: 광주원부인 왕씨; Hanja: 廣州院夫人 王氏) was the eldest daughter of Wang-Gyu who became the 16th wife of Taejo of Goryeo. She was the oldest, among Lady Sogwangjuwon and Lady Hugwangjuwon. After Taejo's death, their father became the most powerful and influence man who tried to kill King Hyejong and placed his only grandson, Prince Gwangjuwon in the throne.
