= O Taryŏn =

Korean nobleman (856–944)

- Prince Daryeon
- Born: 856; Unified Silla
- Died: 944 (aged about 88); Goryeo
- Spouse: Lady Yŏn Tŏkkyo (연덕교)
- Issue: Queen Janghwa
- House: Naju O clan

Korean name
- Hangul: 오다련
- Hanja: 吳多憐
- RR: O Daryeon
- MR: O Taryŏn

Royal title
- Hangul: 다련군
- Hanja: 多憐君
- RR: Daryeongun
- MR: Taryŏn'gun

O Taryŏn (Korean: 오다련; Hanja: 吳多憐; 856–944) was a Korean nobleman from Naju during the Later Three Kingdoms period. He was the father of Queen Janghwa and the father in-law of Wang Kŏn, the founder of the Goryeo dynasty, and the maternal grandfather of Hyejong of Goryeo, son of Queen Janghwa and Wang Kŏn. O Taryŏn was an early supporter of Wang Kŏn, aiding him in the conquest of the Naju area.

O Taryŏn was the son of O Pudon (오부돈; 吳富伅). His family was thought to be wealthy maritime traders of non-aristocratic origins, similar to that of Wang Kŏn's ancestors. The character of pu (부; 富) in his father's name means wealth, symbolizing the wealth of Naju O clan. O Taryŏn married the daughter of a local Silla sagan (사간; 沙干) Yŏn Wi (연위; 連位), who was presumably from a powerful local hojok family.

== In popular culture ==
- Portrayed by Lee Il-woong in the 2000–2002 KBS1 TV series Taejo Wang Geon.
