= Prince Joyi =

Korean Royal Prince

- Hangul: 조이군
- Hanja: 助伊君
- RR: Joigun
- MR: Choigun

Prince Joyi (Korean: 조이군; Hanja: 助伊君) was a Korean Royal Prince as the fourth and youngest son of Taejo of Goryeo and Queen Jeongdeok. He was a Buddhist.

Preceded by Won-Jang	Prince of Goryeo	Succeeded by Su-Myeong
