= Kim Ŏngnyŏm =

Silla nobleman (fl. 10th century)

- Born: Unified Silla
- Died: Goryeo
- Issue: Queen Sinseong
- House: Kim
- Father: Kim Ingyŏng (김인경)

- Kim Ŏngnyŏm
- Hangul: 김억렴
- Hanja: 金億廉
- RR: Gim Eokryeom
- MR: Kim Ŏngnyŏm

Kim Ŏngnyŏm (Korean: 김억렴; Hanja: 金億廉) was a Silla nobleman. He held the rank of chapkan (잡간; 匝干).

Part of the ruling house of Unified Silla, he was the uncle of Gyeongsun of Silla. He was the father of Queen Sinseong, making him the father-in-law of Taejo of Goryeo, and the maternal grandfather of prince Wang Uk.
