= Lady Myeonghye =

- Princess Myeonghye (명혜공주, 明惠公主)

Princess of Goryeo
- Reign: ?–?
- Predecessor: Princess Jeongheon
- Monarch: Wang Mu, King Hyejong
- House: House of Wang (by birth)
- Father: Hyejong of Goryeo
- Mother: Palace Lady Aeiju of the Yeon clan
- Religion: Buddhism

Lady Myeonghye of the Gaeseong Wang clan (Korean: 명혜부인 왕씨; Hanja: 明惠夫人 王氏) or known as Princess Myeonghye (Korean: 명혜공주; Hanja: 明惠公主; "the bright and gentle princess") was a Goryeo Royal Princess as the only daughter of King Hyejong and Lady Yeon, also the younger sister of Wang Je.
