= Kim Ye (aristocrat) =

Korean nobleman (fl. 10th century)

- Hangul: 김예
- Hanja: 金乂
- RR: Gim Ye
- MR: Kim Ye

Wang Ye
- Hangul: 왕예
- Hanja: 王乂
- RR: Wang Ye
- MR: Wang Ye

Kim Ye (Korean: 김예; Hanja: 金乂), later known as Wang Ye (왕예; 王乂), was a Korean hojok, or local aristocratic lord, of Myŏngju (modern-day Gangneung). He lived during the Later Three Kingdoms and early Goryeo periods.

== Life ==
Kim Ye's ancestor, Kim Chu-wŏn, was a failed claimant to the throne of Silla who was compensated by being enfeoffed as the Prince of Myongju. Kim Ye was the sixth-generation descendant of Kim Chu-wŏn and a member of the Gangneung Kim clan. He was the son of Kim Sŏn-hŭi (김선희; 金善希) and a member of the chingol class.

Kim contributed to Wang Kŏn's unification of the Later Three Kingdoms of Korea and was recognized as a merit subject. Taejo Wang Kon granted his own surname, Wang, to Kim, who was now known as Wang Ye. In September 936, Wang Ye participated in the Battle of Illicheon under the command of his kinsman Wang Sun-sik. Under Goryeo, he held the rank of commandant and naesaryŏng. His daughter, Lady Daemyeongjuwon, became one of King Taejo's concubines.
