= Wang Uk =

Wang Uk may refer to:

- Daejong of Goryeo (died 969), Taejo's son and Seongjong's father
- Anjong of Goryeo (died 996), Taejo's son and Hyeonjong's father
- Heonjong of Goryeo (1084–1097), king of Goryeo
