= Lady Sogwangjuwon =

Royal consort of Goryeo (fl. 10th century)

Royal consort of Goryeo
- Predecessor: Lady Gwangjuwon
- Successor: Lady Dongsanwon
- Born: Unknown; Gwangju, Gyeonggi Province
- Died: Unknown; Gwangju, Gyeonggi Province
- Spouse: Taejo of Goryeo
- Issue: Prince Gwangjuwon
- House: Yanggeun Wang clan
- Father: Wang Kyu (왕규)
- Religion: Buddhism

Korean name
- Hangul: 소광주원부인
- Hanja: 小廣州院夫人
- Lit.: Lady of the Little Gwangju Courtyard
- RR: Sogwangjuwon buin
- MR: Sogwangjuwŏn puin

Lady Sogwangjuwon of the Wang clan (Korean: 소광주원부인 왕씨; Hanja: 小廣州院夫人 王氏) was the daughter of Wang Kyu who became the 17th wife of Taejo of Goryeo and bore him a son, Prince Gwangjuwon. Her older sister became Taejo's 16th wife and her younger sister became Hyejong's 2nd wife. After Taejo's death, Wang Kyu was the person who was in charge of the important task of proclaiming Taejo to the inside and outside dynasties and later tried to assassinate Hyejong just to put his only grandson of the throne, but was failed and got executed in September 945.

Meanwhile, some scholars have mixed interpretations of Wang Kyu's role and speculated if her son was killed because of her father's rebellion case. In fact, in most cases, the daughters of a rebels were also destroyed or killed together and it was speculated that she and her sisters also faced the same fate.

== In popular culture ==
- Portrayed by Seo Mi-ae in the 2002–2003 KBS TV series The Dawn of the Empire.
