= Prince Beopdeung =

- Hangul: 법등군
- Hanja: 法登君
- RR: Beopdeunggun
- MR: Pŏptŭnggun

Prince Beopdeung (Korean: 법등군; Hanja: 法登君) was a Korean royal prince who was the third son of Taejo of Goryeo and Lady Seongmu of the Pyeongsan Bak clan. His religion was Buddhism. Like his brothers, Beopdeung had no issue as he died too early to conceive any.

Preceded by Hyo-Myeong	Prince of Goryeo	Succeeded by Ja-Ri
