= Prince Heunghwa =

- Prince of Goryeo
- Died: c.960 Kingdom of Goryeo
- House: House of Wang
- Father: Hyejong of Goryeo
- Mother: Queen Uihwa of the Jincheon Im clan

Korean name
- Hangul: 흥화궁군
- Hanja: 興化宮君
- RR: Heunghwagunggun
- MR: Hŭnghwagunggun

Prince Heunghwa (Korean: 흥화궁군; Hanja: 興化宮君; lit. 'Royal Prince from the Heunghwa Palace'; (Note: Sometimes Prince Heunghwa (흥화군; 興化君).) died c. 960) was a Korean Royal Prince and the only son of Hyejong of Goryeo and Queen Uihwa. He was both a half nephew and older-brother-in-law of Gwangjong of Goryeo since his 1st younger sister became Gwangjong's 2nd wife.

Although Heunghwa was the oldest son and born from the queen, but he was unable to ascend to the throne since he was too young when his father died in 945. So, the throne was taken over by one of his half uncle, Wang Yo and later Wang So. However, after Wang So ascended the throne, the Prince was executed along with his half-cousin, Prince Gyeongchunwon due to the Goryeo Royal Family members' purging which began in 960 (11th year reign of Gwangjong).

== In popular culture ==
- Portrayed by Kim Kyoo-min and Seo Hyun-suk in the 2002–2003 KBS TV series The Dawn of the Empire.

== Notes ==
Preceded by Ui-Seong	Prince of Goryeo	Succeeded by Wang Je
