= Lady Uiseongbuwon =

Royal consort of Goryeo
- Predecessor: Lady Seongmu
- Successor: Lady Wolgyeongwon
- Born: Unknown; Uiseong, North Gyeongsang Province
- Died: Unknown; Uiseong, North Gyeongsang Province
- Spouse: Taejo of Goryeo
- Issue: Grand Prince Uiseongbuwon
- House: Uiseong Hong clan
- Father: Hong Yu
- Religion: Buddhism

Korean name
- Hangul: 의성부원부인
- Hanja: 義城府院夫人
- Lit.: Lady of the Uiseong Courtyard
- RR: Uiseongbuwon buin
- MR: Ŭisŏngbuwŏn puin

Lady Uiseongbuwon of the Uiseong Hong clan (Korean: 의성부원부인 홍씨; Hanja: 義城府院夫人 洪氏) was the daughter of Hong Yu who became the 27th wife of Taejo of Goryeo. Her father was one of the earliest supporters for Wang Kŏn in establishing the new Goryeo dynasty along with Sin Sung-gyŏm, Pok Chigyŏm (복지겸; 卜智謙) and Pae Hyŏn-gyŏng (배현경; 裵玄慶), also they all defeated Kung Ye. Hong Yu also served Taejo as his Three Grand Masters (삼중대광) and with Taejo, she had a son, Grand Prince Uiseongbuwon who later married Lady Yu, 3rd daughter of Queen Jeongdeok.
