= Lady Daeryangwon =

Royal consort of Goryeo
- Predecessor: Lady Heungbokwon
- Successor: Lady Hudaeryangwon
- Born: Unknown; Hapcheon, Kingdom of Unified Silla
- Died: Unknown; Hapcheon, Kingdom of Unified Silla
- Spouse: Taejo of Goryeo
- Issue: Anjong of Goryeo _{disputed}
- House: Yi clan (by birth); House of Wang (by marriage)
- Father: Yi Jeong-eon (이정언)

Korean name
- Hangul: 대량원부인
- Hanja: 大良院夫人
- Lit.: Lady of the Daeryang Courtyard
- RR: Daeryangwon buin
- MR: Taeryangwŏn puin

Lady Daeryangwon of the Yi clan (Korean: 대량원부인 이씨; Hanja: 大良院夫人 李氏) was the daughter of Yi Jeong-eon from the Kingdom of Unified Silla. who became the 13th wife of Taejo of Goryeo. Meanwhile, there is a theory that she was the birth mother of Anjong Wang Uk, but later her son was formally adopted by Queen Sinseong.
