= Lady Daemyeong =

Noblewoman; Royal consort of Goryeo

- Spouse: Gyeongjong of Goryeo
- House: Chŏngju Yu clan (official); Wang (agnatic and by marriage)
- Father: Prince Wonjang
- Mother: Princess Heungbang

Korean name
- Hangul: 대명궁부인
- Hanja: 大明宮夫人
- RR: Daemyeonggung buin
- MR: Taemyŏnggung puin

Lady Daemyeong of the Chŏngju Yu clan (Korean: 대명궁부인 유씨; Hanja: 大明宮夫人 柳氏; lit. 'Lady Yu of the Daemyeong Palace') was a member of the Goryeo royal family. She was the paternal and maternal granddaughter of King Taejo, via Prince Wonjang and Princess Heungbang who were half-siblings. She became the fifth wife of King Gyeongjong. She married her first cousin and thus followed her grandmother's clan, the Chŏngju Yu. She had a brother about whom detailed records were not kept.

Goryeosa does not provide much detail about her life. However, it is known that King Gyeongjong built a palace for her and named it Daemyeonggung (大明宮). Although Gyeongjong's first four consorts were posthumously honoured as queens, she was the only one not to receive the posthumous rank of queen. Some modern scholars have speculated that Princess Heungbang, despite being a royal princess, did not receive the title of queen and remained only the fifth concubine. They believe that she married King Gyeongjong, the latest among all his wives and that her political status was not very high. This is based on the fact that she was not given the title of queen, even though she was of royal descent.
