= Prince Wangwi =

Korean royal prince

- Hangul: 왕위군
- Hanja: 王位君
- RR: Wangwigun
- MR: Wangwigun

Prince Wangwi (Korean: 왕위군; Hanja: 王位君) was a Korean Royal Prince as the first and oldest son of Taejo of Goryeo and Queen Jeongdeok. He was a Buddhist.

== In popular culture ==
- Portrayed by Park Sun-ho in the 2015 MBC TV series Shine or Go Crazy.

Preceded by Wang Uk	Prince of Goryeo	Succeeded by In-Ae
