= Prince Hyomok =

- Prince of Goryeo
- Born: Wang Ui (왕의); Goryeo
- Issue: 1 son
- House: House of Wang
- Father: Taejo of Goryeo
- Mother: Lady Dongyangwon of the Pyeongsan Yu clan
- Religion: Buddhism

Korean name
- Hangul: 왕의
- Hanja: 王義
- RR: Wang Ui
- MR: Wang Ŭi

Royal title
- Hangul: 효목태자
- Hanja: 孝穆太子
- RR: Hyomok taeja
- MR: Hyomok t'aeja

Prince Hyomok (Korean: 효목태자; Hanja: 孝穆太子), personal name Wang Ui (왕의; 王義), was a prince of Goryeo as the oldest son of Taejo of Goryeo and Lady Dongyangwon. He also was the older brother of Prince Hyoeun. Although his wife was not recorded, with this marriage, he had one son, Prince Hyoeun (孝隱太子) Sook (肅), who later became a Korean Buddhist monk. The crown prince and Prince Hyomok were accused of high treason and murdered.
