= Wang Ye =

Wang Ye may refer to:

- Wang Ye (Three Kingdoms), Chinese official of Cao Wei and Western Jin dynasty
- Wang Ye, Cao Wei official and father of Wang Bi
- Wang Ye, also known as Kim Ye, Korean Later Three Kingdoms local aristocratic lord
- Wang Ye worship, Taiwanese folk religion
