= Lady Haeryangwon =

Royal consort of Goryeo (fl. 10th century)

Royal consort of Goryeo
- Predecessor: Lady Mongryangwon
- Successor: Lady Hugwangjuwon
- Born: 890; Gumi, North Gyeongsang Province
- Died: Gumi, North Gyeongsang Province
- Spouse: Taejo of Goryeo
- House: House of Wang (by marriage)
- Father: Choe Seon-Pil (최선필)
- Religion: Buddhism

Korean name
- Hangul: 해량원부인
- Hanja: 海良院夫人
- Lit.: Lady of the Haeryang Courtyard
- RR: Haeryangwon buin
- MR: Haeryangwŏn puin

Lady Haeryangwon (Korean: 해량원부인; Hanja: 海良院夫人) was the daughter of Seon-Pil who became the 30th wife of Taejo of Goryeo. Her father, Choe Seon-pil, helped Wang Geon in established the Goryeo dynasty while he served as a Silla's general. Then, he returned to Goryeo in 930 and Wang Geon gave Seon-Pil special treatment. After that, Taejo then took his daughter as his consort.

== Family ==
- Father - Choe Seon-pil (최선필; 崔宣必; 840–?)
- Unnamed Mother (840–?)
- Spouse - Wang Geon, Taejo of Goryeo (고려 태조; 31 January 877 – 4 July 937) — No issue.
  - Father-in-law - Wang Ryung, Sejo of Goryeo (고려 세조; 840 – May 897)
  - Mother-in-law - Queen Wisuk of the Han clan (위숙왕후 한씨; 850–?)
