= Grand Princess Seongmok =

Goryeo princess (died before 1018)

- Hangul: 성목장공주
- Hanja: 成穆長公主
- RR: Seongmok janggongju
- MR: Sŏngmok changgongju

Grand Princess Seongmok (died before 1018) or shortly-called Princess Seongmok (Korean: 성목공주; Hanja: 成穆公主; "the accomplishment and solemn princess") was a Goryeo royal family member as the daughter of King Taejo's 13th son, Wang Uk.

It was said that she would often go to the temple Hyeonhwasa (현화사) to pray for her parents along with her half younger brother, Wang Sun. From this, Seongmok became the first Korean noblewoman who held the title of Janggongju (장공주, 長公主; "Grand Princess") which was later used by Yilianzhenbala and Jintong.

Although her detailed information was not recorded in Goryeosa, but in 1930 during the Japanese colonial period, her existence was made known through the Hyeonhwa Sabi (현화사비; built in 1018 (10th year reign of King Hyeonjong)) which became the North Korean National Treasure Cultural Relic No. 151 and was discovered at Yeongchu Mountain, Pangyo-ri, Gaeseong-gun, Gyeonggi Province.
