= Grand Lady Heonmok =

Grand Lady Heonmok 헌목대부인

Grand royal consort of Goryeo
- Predecessor: Dynasty established (Queen Jeongdeok as the 6th Queen Consort of Goryeo)
- Successor: Title removed (Lady Jeongmok as the first Royal Consort of Goryeo)
- Born: ? Gyeongju, North Gyeongsang Province
- Died: ? Gyeongju, North Gyeongsang Province
- Spouse: Taejo of Goryeo
- Issue: Prince Sumyeong
- House: Gyeongju Pyeong (by birth); House of Wang (by marriage)
- Father: Pyeong-Jun (평준)
- Religion: Buddhism

Grand Lady Heonmok of the Gyeongju Pyeong clan (Korean: 헌목대부인 평씨; Hanja: 獻穆大夫人 平氏) was the daughter of Pyeong-Jun. She became the 7th wife of Taejo of Goryeo and mother of Prince Sumyeong.

Among all of Taejo's wives and consorts, she held the highest title below the queen. This indicated that her father made an important contribution - to established the new Goryeo Dynasty and possibly that he was a behind-the-scenes figure who promoted Silla's noble wealth. Through her son, Heonmok became the great-grandmother of Queen Seonjeong.
