= Lady Hudaeryangwon =

Royal consort of Goryeo
- Predecessor: Lady Daeryangwon
- Successor: Lady Daemyeongjuwon
- Born: Unknown; Hapcheon, Unified Silla
- Died: Unknown; Hapcheon, Unified Silla
- Spouse: Taejo of Goryeo
- House: Gyeongju Yi clan (by birth); House of Wang (by marriage)
- Father: Yi Won (이원)

Korean name
- Hangul: 후대량원부인
- Hanja: 後大良院夫人
- Lit.: Lady of the Later Daeryang Courtyard
- RR: Hudaeryangwon buin
- MR: Hudaeryangwŏn puin

Lady Hudaeryangwon of the Gyeongju Yi clan (Korean: 후대량원부인 이씨; Hanja: 後大良院夫人 李氏) was the daughter of Yi Won from the Unified Silla periods who became the 14th wife of Taejo of Goryeo.
