= Prince Inae =

- Hangul: 인애군
- Hanja: 仁愛君
- RR: Inaegun
- MR: Inaegun

Prince Inae (Korean: 인애군; Hanja: 仁愛君) was a Korean Royal Prince as the second son of Taejo of Goryeo and Queen Jeongdeok. He was a Buddhist.

Preceded by Wang-Wi	Prince of Goryeo	Succeeded by Won-Jang
