= Queen Janghwa =

Queen consort of Goryeo (fl. 10th century)

Queen Janghwa 장화왕후
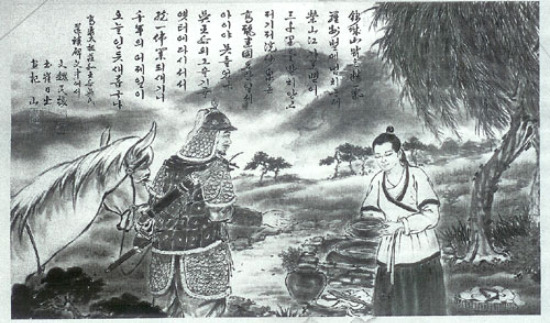
- The Queen and her husband, King Taejo

Queen consort of Goryeo
- Tenure: ?–?
- Predecessor: Queen Sinhye
- Successor: Queen Sinmyeong
- Born: ? Geumseong, Silla
- Died: c. 934 or 943 ??Gaegyeong-si, Goryeo
- Spouse: Taejo of Goryeo
- Issue: Hyejong of Goryeo
Posthumous name
- Janghwa (장화, 莊和; "Solemn and Harmonious")
- House: Naju O clan
- Father: O Ta-ryŏn
- Mother: Lady Yŏn Tŏkgyo

Queen Janghwa of the Naju O clan (Korean: 장화왕후 오씨; Hanja: 莊和王后 吳氏; d. c. 934 or 943) was the second Goryeo queen consort through her marriage as the second wife of Wang Kŏn, its founder and became the mother of his heir and oldest son, King Hyejong.

== Biography ==
Her grandfather, lived in Hamyang but eventually moved to Naju, which at the time was called Geumseong, and was the place that the future Queen was born in. Her father, O Ta-ryŏn, helped King Taejo establish the Goryeo Dynasty. Queen Janghwa is daughter of O Ta-ryon.

== Family ==
- Father: O Ta-ryŏn (856 – 944)
  - Grandfather - O Pang (오방; 吳昉) or O Pusun (오부순; 吳富純; 825 – ?)
- Mother: Lady No Tŏkgyo (노덕교)
  - Grandfather - No Yŏnwi (신라 사간 노연위; 新羅 沙干 連位)
- Siblings
  - Older brother - O Sang (오상; 吳相)
  - Older brother - O Hwan (오환; 吳桓)
  - Younger brother - O Kŏm (오검; 吳檢)
- Husband: King Taejo of Goryeo (January 31, 877 – July 4, 943)
  - Son: King Hyejong of Goryeo (912 – October 23, 945)
    - Daughter-in-law: Queen Uihwa of the Jincheon Im clan

== In popular culture ==
- Portrayed by Yum Jung-ah in the 2000–2002 KBS1 TV Series Taejo Wang Geon.
- Portrayed by Ban Hyo-jung in the 2002–2003 in the KBS TV Series The Dawn of the Empire.
