= Kim Yang =

Member of the Korean Silla royal family

- Hangul: 김양
- Hanja: 金陽
- RR: Gim Yang
- MR: Kim Yang

Kim Yang (Korean: 김양; Hanja: 金陽; 808–857) was part of the Silla royal family and its retainers. Said to be a descendant of the second son of Kim Chunchu.

== In service of Silla ==
Born in 808, he was the son of Kim Chŏng-yŏ, a descendant of Kim Chu-wŏn. In 822, his grand-uncle, Kim Hŏn-ch'ang, launched a failed rebellion, however no harm fell on Kim Yang's side of the family. He served as Viceroy of Silla. Upon the death of Heungdeok of Silla in 836, a succession struggle erupted between Kim Kyun-jŏng (김균정; 金均貞) and his nephew, Kim Che-ryung (?–838). Kim U-jing and his followers, Kim Yang supported Kyun-jŏng while Kim Myŏng and Kim Yi-hong supported Che-ryung. Che-ryung's faction succeeded and Kyun-jŏng was killed, Che-ryung becoming King Huigang. Kim Yang escaped, but U-jing did not. Following the coup and suicide of King Huigang, Kim Myŏng took up the throne as King Minae. Kim Yang, who was then concealing himself on a mountain near the capital, heard the news and raised up an army to go to Cheonghaejin. He told U-jing of these events and persuaded him to have his revenge. U-jing and Kim Yang asked Chang Pogo to help him to take advantage of the confusion of the country and to make himself a king. Chang Pogo agreed and had his friend Jeong Nyeon also follow Ujing. In 839, U-jing, Kim Yang and their followers defeated King Minae's army at the battle of Daegu and quickly advanced upon the capital. All the king's aides then ran away leaving the king behind, so the king hid himself in a villa near the royal palace. Soldiers came into the palace and searched for the king. Finally, they found the king in the villa and killed him in spite of his pleas. Kim Yi-hong was also killed. Ujing then placed himself on the throne as King Sinmu. Known to have orchestrated Chang Pogo's assassination in 846 (or 841) through Yŏm Chang, as Chang received a high position and began conspiring against the King.

== Tomb ==
Kim Yang's tomb lies about 15 meters away from King Muyeol's tomb at Gyeongju.

== Family ==
- Great-Grandfather: Kim Chu-wŏn
- Grandfather: Kim Chong-ki
- Father: Kim Chŏng-yŏ

== See also ==
- Yŏm Chang
- Chang Pogo
- History of Korea
- Military history of Korea
- List of Silla people
