= Lady Yehwa =

Royal consort of Goryeo (fl. 10th century)

Royal consort of Goryeo
- Predecessor: Lady Dongsanwon
- Successor: Lady Daeseowon
- Born: Unknown; Chuncheon, Gangwon
- Died: Unknown; Chuncheon, Gangwon
- Spouse: Taejo of Goryeo
- House: Haeju Wang (by birth); House of Wang (by marriage)
- Father: Wang-Yu (왕유)
- Religion: Buddhism

Korean name
- Hangul: 예화부인
- Hanja: 禮和夫人
- RR: Yehwa buin
- MR: Yehwa puin

Lady Yehwa of the Haeju Wang clan (Korean: 예화부인 왕씨; Hanja: 禮和夫人 王氏) was the daughter of Wang-Yu who became the 19th wife of Taejo of Goryeo. Her father was initially Bak-Yu (박유), but later changed into "Wang" after Taejo established the new Goryeo dynasty. From this point, Wang-Yu became the founder of Haeju Wang clan (해주 왕씨; 海州王氏).
