= Prince Jari =

- Hangul: 자리군
- Hanja: 資利君
- RR: Jarigun
- MR: Charigun

Prince Jari (Korean: 자리군; Hanja: 資利君) was a Korean Royal Prince as the youngest son of Taejo of Goryeo and Lady Seongmu of the Pyeongsan Bak clan. His religion was Buddhism. He died too early at the young age since Ja-ri (자리; 資利) mean was the youngest son, so it seems that he was the youngest son of Taejo among his 25 sons.

| Preceded by Beop-Deung | Prince of Goryeo | Succeeded by Ui-Seong |
