= Hugwangju =

Korean noblewoman (fl. 10th century)

Lady Hugwangjuwon
- Born: Unknown; Gwangju, Gyeonggi
- Died: Unknown; Gwangju, Gyeonggi
- Spouse: Hyejong of Goryeo
- House: Gangneung Wang (by birth); House of Wang (by marriage)
- Father: Wang-Gyu (왕규)
- Religion: Buddhism

Korean name
- Hangul: 후광주원부인
- Hanja: 後廣州院夫人
- RR: Hugwangjuwon buin
- MR: Hugwangjuwŏn puin

Lady Hugwangjuwon of the Wang clan (Korean: 후광주원부인 왕씨; Hanja: 後廣州院夫人 王氏; lit. 'Lady of the Later Gwangju Courtyard') was the second wife of Hyejong of Goryeo. She was the youngest, among Lady Gwangjuwon and Lady Sogwangjuwon. Following their father's execution in 945 after trying to put Prince Gwangjuwon in the throne, some modern scholars who believed that the daughters of a traitor were often stripped from their title, expelled from the palace and killed together with the whole clan speculated that these sisters met with the same fate.

== In popular culture ==
- Portrayed by Kang Kyung-hun in the 2002–2003 KBS TV series The Dawn of the Empire.
