= Grand Prince Uiseongbuwon =

Prince of Goryeo (fl. 10th century)

Grand Prince Uiseong
- Prince of Goryeo
- Spouse: Princess Wang/Lady Ryu
- House: House of Wang
- Father: Taejo of Goryeo
- Mother: Lady Uiseong of the Uiseong Hong clan
- Religion: Buddhism

Korean name
- Hangul: 의성부원대군
- Hanja: 義城府院大君
- Lit.: Grand Prince of the Uiseong Courtyard
- RR: Uiseongbuwon daegun
- MR: Ŭisŏngbuwŏn taegun

Grand Prince Uiseong (Korean: 의성부원대군; Hanja: 義城府院大君) was a Korean royal prince as the only son of Taejo of Goryeo and Lady Uiseong who married his half-sister and had no any issue.

Preceded by Ja-Ri	Prince of Goryeo	Succeeded by Heung-Hwa
