= Prince Gwangjuwon =

Goryeo prince (fl. 10th century)

Prince Gwangju
- Prince of Goryeo
- Born: Unknown; Songak, Goryeo
- Died: after 945; Goryeo
- House: Wang
- Father: Taejo of Goryeo
- Mother: Lady Sogwangjuwon of the Wang clan
- Religion: Buddhism

Korean name
- Hangul: 광주원군
- Hanja: 廣州院君
- RR: Gwangjuwongun
- MR: Kwangjuwŏn'gun

Prince Gwangjuwon (Korean: 광주원군; Hanja: 廣州院君; lit. 'Prince of the Gwangju Courtyard') was a royal prince of Goryeo. He was the only son of King Taejo of Goryeo and Lady Sogwangjuwon.

== Biography ==
=== Birth ===
Prince Gwangjuwon was born as the son of King Taejo and Lady Sogwangjuwon. Gwangjuwon's maternal grandfather, Wang Kyu, was the head of an influential regional family. Gwangjuwon's birth name and birth date, are unknown.

=== Wang Kyu's rebellion ===
In 945, Wang Kyu sent assassins to kill King Hyejong while he was sleeping in his room so that Gwangjuwon could ascend to the throne. However, the king personally beat all of the assassins to death, foiling the plot. Not long after, Wang Kyu again sent assassins to kill Hyejong. However, Hyejong, after hearing a prophecy from astronomer Ch'oe Chi-mong, slept in another room, avoiding the assassination attempt.

However, even if Hyejong was killed, the throne would have gone to Taejo's older sons, Wang Yo (the future Jeongjong of Goryeo) and Wang So (the future Gwangjong of Goryeo), instead of Gwangjuwon. Realizing this, Wang Kyu attempted to frame the two princes, to no avail.

Meanwhile, in September of the same year, Wang Kyu was beheaded after being suppressed by the forces from Wang Yo and Wang Sing-nyŏm.

== Aftermath ==
A historian Kim Chang-Hyeon (김창현), on his book The Empire of Gwangjong (광종의 제국), estimated that the Prince was also executed by both of his half brothers, Jeongjong of Goryeo and Gwangjong of Goryeo who had tragically ruled the Prince's maternal grandfather, Wang Kyu (왕규) at this time. This was because it was believed that not only Wang Gyu but also the Prince could have acquired the legitimacy of the political affairs.

== In popular culture ==
- Portrayed by Byun Baek-hyun in the 2016 SBS TV Series Moon Lovers: Scarlet Heart Ryeo.

Preceded by Wang Jik	Prince of Goryeo	Succeeded by Hyo-Je
