= Prince Hyoseong =

- Prince of Goryeo
- Born: Wang Imju / Wang Lim-joo; Goryeo
- Died: 976; Goryeo
- Spouse: Princess Wang/Lady Bak
- House: House of Wang
- Father: Taejo of Goryeo
- Mother: Lady Cheonan of the Gyeongju Im clan
- Religion: Buddhism

Korean name
- Hangul: 왕임주
- Hanja: 王林州
- RR: Wang Imju
- MR: Wang Imju

Royal title
- Hangul: 효성태자
- Hanja: 孝成太子
- RR: Hyoseong taeja
- MR: Hyosŏng t'aeja

Prince Hyoseong (Korean: 효성태자; Hanja: 孝成太子; d. 976), personal name Wang Imju (Korean: 왕임주; Hanja: 王林州) was a Korean Royal Prince as the oldest son of Taejo of Goryeo and Lady Cheonan. He was the older brother of Prince Hyoji and later married his half niece, only daughter of King Jeongjong and Queen Munseong. After supported Gwangjong's Kingship reinforcement plan, he and his other half brother, Prince Wonnyeong was killed in 976 by the released nobles when the King's abolition of the aristocratic deterrence was abolished.

== In popular culture ==
- Portrayed by Choi Sung-min in the 2002–2003 KBS TV series The Dawn of the Empire.
- Portrayed by Shin Jung-yoon in the 2015 MBC TV Series Shine or Go Crazy.
