= Lady Dongyangwon =

Royal consort of Goryeo (fl. 10th century)

Royal consort of Goryeo
- Predecessor: Lady Jeongmok
- Successor: Lady Sukmok
- Born: Unknown; Pyeongsan, Hwanghae
- Died: Unknown; Pyeongsan, Hwanghae
- Spouse: Taejo of Goryeo
- Issue: Prince Hyomok; Prince Hyoeun
- House: Pyeongsan Yu (by birth); House of Wang (by marriage)
- Father: Yu Geum-Pil (유금필)
- Religion: Buddhism

Korean name
- Hangul: 동양원부인
- Hanja: 東陽院夫人
- Lit.: Lady of the Eastern Yang Courtyard
- RR: Dongyangwon buin
- MR: Tongyangwŏn puin

Lady Dongyangwon of the Pyeongsan Yu clan (Korean: 동양원부인 유씨; Hanja: 東陽院夫人 庾氏) was the daughter of Yu Geum-Pil who became the 9th wife of Taejo of Goryeo. Her father was a representative general under his command who showed many achievements, such as helping Taejo on several battlefields and gave the big contribution with participating in the unification of the Later Three Kingdoms and established the new Goryeo dynasty. Both of Yu Geung (유긍), Yu Gwan-yu (유관유) and Yu Gyeong (유경) were her brothers. She bore Taejo 2 sons: Wang Ui and Wang Won.

However, her 2nd son was murdered by his half brother, Gwangjong of Goryeo due to Won's rebellion plotted and his two sons (Wang Im and Wang Jeong) were escaped from their death, but after King Mokjong was dethroned and King Hyeonjong took the throne, they were reinstated and placed as an enemy of the Royal household.

== In popular culture ==
- Portrayed by Han Bok-hee in the 2002–2003 KBS TV series The Dawn of the Empire.
