= Wang T'ae =

- Prince of Goryeo
- Spouse: Princess Wang
- House: House of Wang
- Father: Taejo of Goryeo
- Mother: Queen Sinmyeong of the Chungju Yu clan

Korean name
- Hangul: 왕태
- Hanja: 王泰
- RR: Wang Tae
- MR: Wang T'ae

Wang T'ae (Korean: 왕태; Hanja: 王泰) was a Korean Royal Prince as the first and oldest son of Taejo of Goryeo and Queen Sinmyeong, also the oldest brother of Yo and So. He married his half sister (only daughter of Lady Heungbok), but they had no any issue. Since his younger brothers succeeded the throne, it was believed that he died at a young age before able to ascended the throne.

== In popular culture ==
- Portrayed by Lee Jae-eung in the 2000–2002 KBS1 TV series Taejo Wang Geon.
- Portrayed by Oh Eun-chan in the 2015 MBC TV series Shine or Go Crazy.
