= Lady Jeongmok =

Royal consort of Goryeo (fl. 10th century)

Royal consort of Goryeo
- Predecessor: Dynasty established (Grand Lady Heonmok as the Grand Royal Consort of Goryeo)
- Successor: Lady Dongyangwon
- Born: Unknown; Myeongju, Gangwon
- Died: Unknown; Myeongju, Gangwon
- Spouse: Taejo of Goryeo
- Issue: Dowager Queen Sunan
- House: Gangneung Wang (by birth); House of Wang (by marriage)
- Father: Wang-Gyeong (왕경)
- Religion: Buddhism

Korean name
- Hangul: 정목부인
- Hanja: 貞穆夫人
- RR: Jeongmok buin
- MR: Chŏngmok puin

Lady Jeongmok of the Gangneung Wang clan (Korean: 정목부인 왕씨; Hanja: 貞穆夫人 王氏) was the daughter of Wang-Gyeong who became the 8th wife of Taejo of Goryeo and mother of Dowager Queen Sunan. Later, in 922, General Wang Sun-sik from Myeongju (명주장군 왕순식) was inside fighting, Wang-Gyeon was given a royal fortress, a government office and a residence.
