= Lady Seongmu =

Royal consort of Goryeo (fl.10th century)

Royal consort of Goryeo
- Predecessor: Lady Sohwangjuwon
- Successor: Lady Uiseongbuwon
- Born: Unknown; Pyeongsan, North Hwanghae Province
- Died: Unknown; Pyeongsan, North Hwanghae Province
- Spouse: Taejo of Goryeo
- Issue: Prince Hyoje; Prince Hyomyeong; Prince Beopdeung; Prince Jari; Princess Wang
- House: Pyeongsan Bak (by birth); House of Wang (by marriage)
- Father: Bak Ji-yun (박지윤)
- Religion: Buddhism

Korean name
- Hangul: 성무부인
- Hanja: 聖茂夫人
- RR: Seongmu buin
- MR: Sŏngmu puin

Lady Seongmu of the Pyeongsan Bak clan (Korean: 성무부인 박씨; Hanja: 聖茂夫人 朴氏) was the daughter of Bak Ji-yun, one of Wang Geon's helper in founding the new Goryeo dynasty who became the 26th wife of Taejo of Goryeo. She gave birth to 4 sons and a daughter who later married King Gyeongsun of Silla, but all of her sons died young without left any issue. Since both of Bak Su-mun (박수문) and Bak Su-gyeong (박수경) were her brothers, she then became the aunt of her husband's 28th and 29th wife.
