= Lady Seojeonwon =

Royal consort of Goryeo
- Predecessor: Lady Soseowon
- Successor: Lady Sinjuwon
- Spouse: Taejo of Goryeo
- House: House of Wang (by marriage)
- Religion: Buddhism

Korean name
- Hangul: 서전원부인
- Hanja: 西殿院夫人
- Lit.: Lady of the Western Temple Courtyard
- RR: Seojeonwon buin
- MR: Sŏjŏnwŏn puin

Lady Seojeonwon (Korean: 서전원부인; Hanja: 西殿院夫人) was a Korean royal consort as the 22nd wife of Taejo of Goryeo. Among her husband's other wives, just she who can't know from what clan or who was her families. Because of this, some modern scholars expected and interpreted that her position within the Goryeo royal family was not very high.
