= Prince Hyoji =

Royal prince of Goryeo (fl. 10th century)

- Hangul: 효지태자
- Hanja: 孝祗太子
- RR: Hyoji taeja
- MR: Hyoji t'aeja

Prince Hyoji (Korean: 효지태자; Hanja: 孝祗太子) was a prince of Goryeo as the second and youngest son of Taejo of Goryeo and Lady Cheonanbuwon of the Gyeongju Im clan. He was a Buddhist and the younger brother of Prince Hyoseong. His personal name is not listed in historical records and he had no descendants.
