= Lady Heungbokwon =

Royal consort of Goryeo (fl. 10th century)

Royal consort of Goryeo
- Predecessor: Lady Cheonanbuwon
- Successor: Lady Daeryangwon
- Born: Unknown; Hongseong, South Chungcheong Province
- Died: Unknown; Hongseong, South Chungcheong Province
- Spouse: Taejo of Goryeo
- Issue: Wang Jik; A daughter
- House: Hongju Hong (by birth); House of Wang (by marriage)
- Father: Hong Gyu (홍규)
- Religion: Buddhism

Korean name
- Hangul: 흥복원부인
- Hanja: 興福院夫人
- Lit.: Lady of the Heungbok Courtyard
- RR: Heungbogwon buin
- MR: Hŭngbogwŏn puin

Lady Heungbokwon of the Hongju Hong clan (Korean: 흥복원부인 홍씨; Hanja: 興福院夫人 洪氏) was the daughter of Hong-Gyu, the founder of Hongju Hong clan (홍주 홍씨; 洪州 洪氏). She became the 12th wife of Taejo of Goryeo.

Her father Hong-Gyu's first name was Geung-Jun (긍준), a noble from Seongju. In March 927, Wang Geon attacked and occupied Unju Castle (운주성), and afterward, Hong-Gyu gave his daughter to Wang to become his 12th wife. In addition, Unju was an important place since Chinese envoys always entered and departed to Goryeo from here. She later bore Taejo a son and a daughter, Princess Wang (공주 왕씨), who later married Wang Tae, Taejo and Queen Sinmyeong's oldest son. However, as Wang Tae's younger brothers, Wang Yo and Wang So would come to succeed the throne in the future, it seems that Wang Tae died at the young age.
