= Lady Gyeonghwa =

Princess of Goryeo (fl. 10th century)

Lady Gyeonghwa 경화궁부인

Princess of Goryeo
- Successor: Princess Jeongheon
- Monarch: Wang Mu, King Hyejong
- Spouse: Gwangjong of Goryeo
- House: Jincheon Im clan (official); Wang (agnatic and by marriage)
- Father: Hyejong of Goryeo
- Mother: Queen Uihwa of the Jincheon Im clan
- Religion: Buddhism

Lady Gyeonghwa of the Jincheon Im clan (Korean: 경화궁부인 임씨; Hanja: 慶和宮夫人 林氏; lit. 'Lady Im of the Gyeonghwa Palace') was a Goryeo Royal Princess as the first and oldest daughter of King Hyejong and Queen Uihwa who became the second wife of her half uncle, King Gwangjong, which she then followed her maternal clan. As a Princess, she therefore was called as Princess Gyeonghwa (경화공주; 慶和公主) or Grand Princess Gyeonghwa (경화장공주; 慶和長公主).

When Wang Gyu accused the King's half-brothers, Yo and So of plotting treason, the King then gave his eldest daughter to So as his 2nd wife, and it was believed that they were married in 944. Meanwhile, her father's effort to safeguard his own life from the political treatment meant she was married to her uncle who had already secured his position in the royal family through his first marriage. Gyeonghwa's marriage with So was a purely political marriage. Due to her father's status as King she was a Royal Princess by birth, but in later years was better known as Gwangjong's "Madam" (부인; 夫人) rather than "Queen consort" (왕후; 王后) as the title of Queen Consort belonged to Daemok, his first wife (formerly half younger sister).

== In popular culture ==
- Portrayed by Kim Min-kyung and Jang Han-na in the 2002–2003 KBS TV series The Dawn of the Empire.
- Portrayed by Jang Seo-hee in the 2016 SBS TV series Moon Lovers: Scarlet Heart Ryeo.
