= Lady Soseowon =

Royal consort of Goryeo
- Predecessor: Lady Daeseowon
- Successor: Lady Seojeonwon
- Born: Unknown; Seoheung, North Hwanghae Province
- Died: Unknown; Seoheung, North Hwanghae Province
- Spouse: Taejo of Goryeo
- House: Dongju Gim (by birth); House of Wang (by marriage)
- Father: Gim Haeng-Pa (김행파)
- Religion: Buddhism

Korean name
- Hangul: 소서원부인
- Hanja: 小西院夫人
- Lit.: Lady of the Little Western Region
- RR: Soseowon buin
- MR: Sosŏwŏn puin

Lady Soseowon of the Dongju Gim clan (Korean: 소서원부인 김씨; Hanja: 小西院夫人 金氏) was the daughter of Gim Haeng-Pa who became the 21st wife of Taejo of Goryeo and the younger sister of her husband's 20th wife, Lady Daeseowon.
