= Lady Cheonanbuwon =

Royal consort of Goryeo (fl. 10th century)

Royal consort of Goryeo
- Predecessor: Lady Sukmok
- Successor: Lady Heungbokwon
- Born: Unknown; Gyeongju, Gyeongsang Province
- Died: Unknown; Gyeongju, Gyeongsang Province
- Spouse: Taejo of Goryeo
- Issue: Prince Hyoseong; Prince Hyoji
- House: Gyeongju Im (by birth); House of Wang (by marriage)
- Father: Im-Eon (임언)
- Religion: Buddhism

Korean name
- Hangul: 천안부원부인
- Hanja: 天安府院夫人
- Lit.: Lady of the Cheonan Courtyard
- RR: Cheonanbuwon buin
- MR: Ch'ŏnanbuwŏn puin

Lady Cheonanbuwon of the Gyeongju Im clan (Korean: 천안부원부인 임씨; Hanja: 天安府院夫人 林氏) was the daughter of Im-Eon who became the 11th wife of Taejo of Goryeo. Her father was a Cheonan Governor and two times came to Taejo as his envoy in 927. She bore Taejo 2 sons. Their first son married a daughter of King Jeongjong and Queen Munseong, but had no any issue. This son later murdered in the aftermath of the revenge law enforced by King Gyeongjong, his half nephew. It seems that her 2nd son also didn't have any issue and died young.
