= Princess Heungbang =

Princess of Goryeo (fl. 10th century)

Princess of Goryeo
- Predecessor: Princess Nakrang (Note: Full older sister.)
- Successor: Queen Daemok (Note: Half younger sister.)
- Monarch: Wang Geon, King Taejo
- Spouse: Prince Wonjang
- Issue: Prince Heungbang; Lady Daemyeong
- House: House of Wang (by birth and marriage)
- Father: Taejo of Goryeo
- Mother: Queen Sinmyeong of the Chungju Yu clan
- Religion: Buddhism

Korean name
- Hangul: 흥방궁주
- Hanja: 興芳宮主
- RR: Heungbang gungju
- MR: Hŭngbang kungju

Princess Heungbang was a Goryeo Royal Princess as the youngest daughter of King Taejo and Queen Sinmyeong. She was also the younger sister-in-law of King Gyeongsun of Silla, who later married her half brother, Prince Wonjang. Princess Heungbang had a son Prince Heungbang and a daughter Lady Daemyeong, who would become King Gyeongjong's fifth wife. From her title, Heungbang became the first Korean Princess who held the title gungju (궁주; 宮主). The use of the title gungju for the king's daughter began with the case of Princess Heungbang. In addition, the title gungju was also used for princesses, and this form continued throughout the Goryeo periods.
