= Prince Wonnyeong =

Prince of Goryeo (fl. 10th century)

- Prince of Goryeo
- Died: 976; Goryeo
- Issue: Prince Hyodang
- House: House of Wang
- Father: Taejo of Goryeo
- Mother: Lady Sukmok of the Jinju Im clan
- Religion: Buddhism

Korean name
- Hangul: 원녕태자
- Hanja: 元寧太子
- RR: Wonnyeong taeja
- MR: Wŏnnyŏng t'aeja

Prince Wonnyeong (Korean: 원녕태자; Hanja: 元寧太子; d. 976) or known as Lord Jinju (진주낭군; 鎭州郞君) was a Korean Royal Prince as the only son of Taejo of Goryeo and Lady Sukmok.

== Biography ==
After 960 (11th year reign of his half younger brother, Gwangjong of Goryeo), Gwangjong carried out a large-scale purging of the family members in order to strengthen the Kingship. However, after Gwangjong died, his son, Gyeongjong of Goryeo took over the throne and the Goryeo Royal family members who had been purged during Gwangjong conducted revenge dramas under the leadership by those royal family members who disagree with these.

Prince Wonnyeong and his half brother, Prince Hyoseong was also murdered and killed around 976 (1st year reign of Gyeongjong). After his death, Gyeongjong become inflamed with the revenge method and sent the royal family line to return in November in the same year.

On the other hand, there was an opinion that the Prince and others provided considerable support for the purged of Gwangjong's family. During his lifetime, he also called as Lord Jinju (진주낭군; 鎭州郞君). Although his wife was not recorded, he had 1 son with her, Prince Hyodang (효당태자).

== In popular culture ==
- Portrayed by Kim Gwang-young in the 2002–2003 KBS TV series The Dawn of the Empire.
