= Lady Daeseowon =

Royal consort of Goryeo (fl. 10th century)

Royal consort of Goryeo
- Predecessor: Lady Yehwa
- Successor: Lady Soseowon
- Born: Unknown; Seoheung, North Hwanghae Province
- Died: Unknown; Seoheung, North Hwanghae Province
- Spouse: Taejo of Goryeo
- House: Dongju Gim (by birth); House of Wang (by marriage)
- Father: Gim Haeng-Pa (김행파)
- Religion: Buddhism

Korean name
- Hangul: 대서원부인
- Hanja: 大西院夫人
- Lit.: Lady of the Grand Western Region
- RR: Daeseowon buin
- MR: Taesŏwŏn puin

Lady Daeseowon of the Dongju Gim clan (Korean: 대서원부인 김씨; Hanja: 大西院夫人 金氏) was the daughter of Gim Haeng-Pa who became the 20th wife of Taejo of Goryeo. She was the older sister of Lady Soseowon, her husband's 21st wife. In 922, their father moved to Seogyeong (now Pyongyang) under King Taejo's command.

One day, when Taejo went to Seogyeong, Gim Haeng-Pa met him on the road with the group he was hunting with and asked Taejo to come to his house. Taejo then agree this and came to Gim's house which he had his two daughters to take care of Taejo for one night each. However, after that day, Taejo didn't return again and as a result, that two women went back home and became nuns. Later, when Taejo heard these story, he took pity on the two sisters and called them, but when Taejo saw them, he said:

"Since you have already gone home, you cannot take it away from you."
"너희가 이미 출가하였으므로, 그 뜻을 빼앗을 수 없다."

Seogyeong then built 2 Temples under Palace's command, there were: "Grand Western" (대서원; 大西院) and "Little Western" (소서원; 小西院) with each had a field and slaves, so that the two sisters were each to live there. Because of this, the older sister named "Lady (Dae)Seowon" and the younger sister named "Lady (So)Seowon".
