= Lady Daemyeongjuwon =

Royal consort of Goryeo (fl. 10th century)

Royal consort of Goryeo
- Spouse: Taejo of Goryeo
- House: Gangneung Wang clan
- Father: Wang Ye
- Religion: Buddhism

Korean name
- Hangul: 대명주원부인
- Hanja: 大溟州院夫人
- Lit.: Lady of the Grand Myeongju Courtyard
- RR: Daemyeongjuwon buin
- MR: Taemyŏngjuwŏn puin

Lady Daemyeongjuwon of the Gangneung Wang clan (Korean: 대명주원부인 왕씨; Hanja: 大溟州院夫人 王氏) was the daughter of Wang Ye who became the 15th wife of Taejo of Goryeo. Wang Ye's surname was originally "Kim" as the son of Kim Sŏn-hŭi (김선희; 金善希) and the 6th generation descendant of Kim Chu-wŏn. After Wang Kŏn established the new Goryeo dynasty, Ye was given new Surname "Wang" due to his contribution in helping Wang Kŏn unify the Later Three Kingdoms. Wang Ye served under Wang Sun-sik (왕순식)'s command in the wars to reunify Korea. Wang Ye's family and descendants were the most powerful family in Gangneung from generation to generation.
