= I'm Sorry, But I Love You =

- Also known as: I'm Sorry Kang Nam-goo
- Genre: Melodrama; Revenge; Family; Romantic comedy
- Created by: Hong Chang-wook
- Written by: Kim In-Kang
- Starring: Kim Min-seo; Park Sun-ho; Lee In; Na Ya; Kim Joo-ri
- Country of origin: South Korea
- Original language: Korean
- No. of episodes: 120

Production
- Executive producer: Park Jae-sam
- Producer: Lee Hui-su
- Running time: 40 minutes
- Production companies: Celltrion Entertainment (Formerly Dream E&M)

Original release
- Network: SBS
- Release: December 19, 2016 – 9 June 2017

I'm Sorry, But I Love You (Korean: 아임 쏘리 강남구; RR: Aim ssori gangnamgu) is a 2016 South Korean television series starring Kim Min-seo, Park Sun-ho, Lee In, Na Ya and Kim Joo-ri. It aired on SBS on Mondays to Fridays at 8:30 AM KST starting December 19, 2016.

== Summary ==
A lethal but innocent love story of a man who only pursued success for his family towards a woman who lost everything after finding her husband's rich parents.

== Cast ==
=== Main cast ===
- Kim Min-seo as Jung Mo-ah / Kang Nam-shil

Do-hoon's ex-wife, grew up in orphanage with him. She has a child Jae-min with Do-hoon. Hated by Myung-suk because of her poor background.

- Park Sun-ho as Kang Nam-goo / Shin Min-joon

He grew up in a grassroots environment and developed an interest in helping others. He is described by those around him as kind, helpful, and passionate.

- Lee In as Park Do-hoon

He grew up in orphanage with Mo-ah, was a kind-hearted person at first. After he discovered that he is the son of the chairman of TMO Group, it changed his whole life.

- Na Ya as Cha Young-hwa

Daughter of the member of National Assembly. She was rebellious so that she did not accept the arranged marriages offered by her parents in the past. After her parents discovered that she is suffering from Infertility, she was forced to become Do-hoon's new wife.

- Kim Joo-ri as Shin Hee-joo

Daughter of Shin Tae-hak, chairman of TMO Group. She loves to help improving the living quality of the poor children in Africa.

=== People around Mo-ah ===
- Lee Eung-kyung as Jung Sook-ja

Mo-ah's aunt.

- Lee Seung-hyung as Gong Man-soo

Mo-ah's uncle.

- Ham Hyung-ki as Jung Mo-hyuk

Mo-ah's younger brother.

- Lee Joo-sil as Lee Kkot-nim

Sook-ja's mother-in-law.

- Cho Yeon-woo as Gong Chun-soo

Man-soo's younger brother.

- Son Hwa-ryung as Gong Shin-ae

Sook-ja and Man-soo's daughter.

- Choi Jung-hoo as Park Jae-min

Mo-ah and Do-hoon's son.

=== People around Nam-goo ===
- Hwang Mi-seon as Kim Soo-book

Nam-goo's mother.

- Heo Young-ran as Kang Nam-hee

Nam-goo's elder sister, suffering from a slight intellectual disability.

=== People around Do-hoon ===
- Hyun Suk as Shin Tae-hak

Do-hoon's father, TMO Group's chairman.

- Cha Hwa-yeon as Hong Myung-sook

Do-hoon's mother.

- Lee Chang-hoon as Shin Tae-jin

Tae-hak's younger brother.

- Jung Jae-eun as Mrs.Min

=== Others ===
- Cha Yeob as Kim Joong-dae

Nam-goo's best friend.

- Lee Eun-chae as Lee Joo-hee
- Oh Na-mi as Yoon Joo
- Kim Dong-gyun as Ma Dong-gyun
- Goo Hye-ryung as Housekeeper
- Kim Kwang-in as Jo Sang-hyun
- Kim Shin as Secretary Choi

=== Cameos ===
- Lee Han-wi as Park Dong-jin
- Bang Eun-hee as Home shopping model
- Lee Yeon-kyung as Show host
- Park Jung-woo as Lawyer Park

== Awards and nominations ==
Year	Award	Category	Nominee	Result
2017	25th SBS Drama Awards	Excellence Award, Actress in a Daily/Weekend Drama	Kim Min-seo	Nominated
2017	25th SBS Drama Awards	Best New Actor	Park Sun-ho	Nominated
