= Queen Uihwa =

Queen Uihwa 의화왕후

Princess consort of Goryeo
- Tenure: 921–922
- Coronation: 921
- Predecessor: Dynasty established
- Successor: ?

Crown Princess of Goryeo
- Tenure: 922–943
- Coronation: 922
- Predecessor: Dynasty established
- Successor: Crown Princess Gim

Queen consort of Goryeo
- Tenure: 943–945
- Coronation: 943
- Predecessor: Queen Sinmyeong
- Successor: Queen Mungong
- Born: 910; Jincheon-gun, North Chungcheong Province
- Died: c.945 (aged about mid 30s); Goryeo
- Burial: Sulleung tomb
- Spouse: Hyejong of Goryeo (m.921)
- Issue: Prince Heunghwa; Princess Gyeonghwa; Princess Jeongheon
Posthumous name
- Queen Seongui Gyeongsin Hoeseon Jeongsun Uihwa 성의경신회선정순의화왕후 (成懿景信懷宣靖順義和王后)
- House: Jincheon Im clan
- Father: Im Hui

Queen Uihwa of the Jincheon Im clan (Korean: 의화왕후 임씨; Hanja: 義和王后 林氏; 910–?) was a Goryeo queen consort as the first and primary wife of King Hyejong. Their only son must lost his life for political reasons during King Gwangjong's reign without able to ascended the throne and their eldest daughter instead became Gwangjong's 2nd wife also for political alliance.

The 11-year-old Lady Im married the 10-year-old Hyejong when he was still a Prince (태자; 太子) in 921. It was believed that the regional position of the "Jincheon Im clan", and her father's influence and power in military were taken into account in the reason that King Taejo chose her as a primary spouse to his eldest son who was weak in power and wanted to unite with the military through marriage. When he was chosen as the Crown Prince (정윤; 正胤) in 922 by recommendation of Bak Sul-hui (박술희), she also became the Crown Princess Consort (정윤비; 正胤妃). She later formally became the Queen Consort in 943 followed her husband's ascension.

Although her death date was unknown, but it was presumed that she was also died when Hyejong got assassinated in 945 and recorded that she was buried in Sulleung tomb (순릉; 順陵) alongside him. By this marriage, Queen Uihwa became the first "Princess consort" (태자비; 太子妃) and "Crown Princess consort" (정윤비; 正胤妃) of the Goryeo period.

== Posthumous name ==
- In April 1002 (5th year reign of King Mokjong), name Seong-ui (성의; 成懿) was added.
- In March 1014 (5th year reign of King Hyeonjong), name Gyeong-sin (경신; 景信) was added.
- In April 1027 (18th year reign of King Hyeonjong), name Hoe-seon (회선; 懷宣) was added.
- In October 1253 (40th year reign of King Gojong), name Jeong-sun (정순; 靖順) was added to her posthumous name too.

== In popular culture ==
- Portrayed by Kim Hyun-joo in the 2002–2003 KBS TV series The Dawn of the Empire.
- Portrayed by Im Mi-sun in the 2016 SBS TV series Moon Lovers: Scarlet Heart Ryeo.

== Family ==
- Father - Im Hui (임희, 林曦; 880–?)
- Unnamed mother (884–?)
- Sibling(s)
  - Older sister - Lady Im of the Jincheon Im clan (진천 임씨, 鎭川 林氏; 897–?)
  - Younger brother - Im Se-sang (임세상, 林世相)
  - Younger sister - Lady Im of the Jincheon Im clan (진천 임씨)
- Spouse - Wang Mu, King Hyejong of Goryeo (고려 혜종; 912–945)
  - Father-in-law - Wang Geon, King Taejo of Goryeo (고려 태조; 877–943)
  - Mother-in-law - Queen Shinmyeongsunseong of the Chungju Yu clan (신명순성왕태후 유씨; 880–?)
- Issue
  - Daughter - Lady Gyeonghwa (경화궁부인; 928–?)
    - Son-in-law - Wang So, King Gwangjong of Goryeo (고려 광종; 925–975)
  - Son - Prince Royal Heunghwa (흥화궁군; 930–?)
  - Daughter - Princess Jeongheon (정헌공주; 932–?)
