= Princess Jeongheon =

Princess of Goryeo Korea

- Princess Jeonghye (정혜공주, 貞惠公主)

Princess of Goryeo
- Reign: ?–?
- Predecessor: Princess Gyeonghwa
- Successor: Princess Myeonghye
- Monarch: Wang Mu, King Hyejong
- House: House of Wang (by birth)
- Father: Hyejong of Goryeo
- Mother: Queen Uihwa of the Jincheon Im clan
- Religion: Buddhism

Princess Jeongheon (Korean: 정헌공주; Hanja: 貞憲公主) or known before as Princess Jeonghye (Korean: 정혜공주; Hanja: 貞惠公主) was a Goryeo Royal Princess as the second and youngest daughter of King Hyejong and Queen Uihwa.
