= Park Sun-ho =

South Korean actor, singer, and model (born 1993)

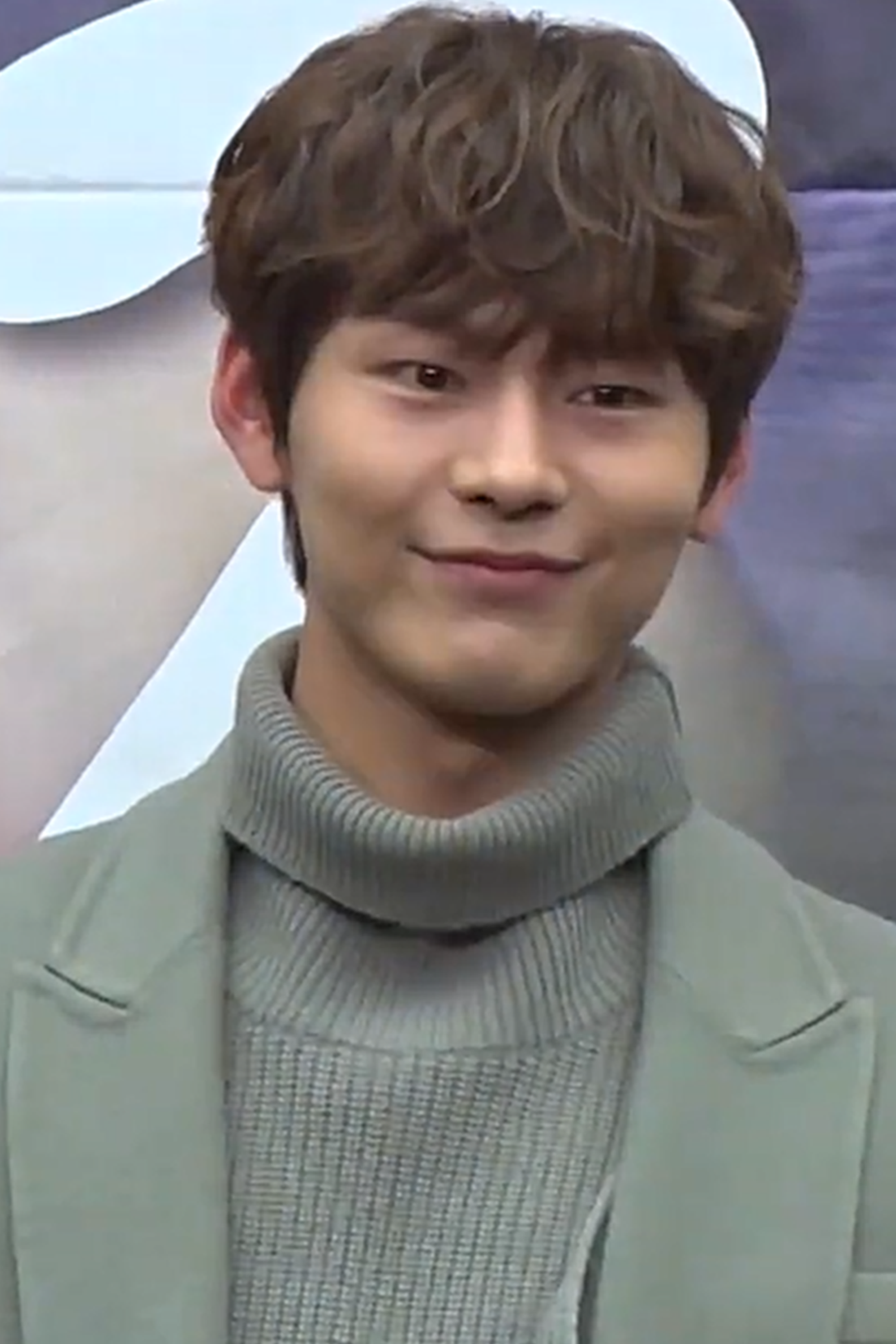
- Park in 2019
- Born: May 9, 1993 (age 33); Seodaemun District, Seoul, South Korea
- Occupations: Actor; model; singer
- Agent: Namoo Actors

Korean name
- Hangul: 박선호
- Hanja: 朴宣浩
- RR: Bak Seonho
- MR: Pak Sŏnho

Park Sun-ho (Korean: 박선호; born May 9, 1993) is a South Korean actor, singer, and model. Park made his acting debut in the MBC television series Golden Rainbow in 2014. He also debuted as a singer in 2014 with the song "After Love" (Ballad Ver.) for the 2014 television series Love Cells.

Most recently, Park is known for being a contestant on the Mnet boy group survival program Produce X 101 (2019) and as Lee Gwang-cheol in the OCN television series Rugal (2020).

== Career ==
=== 2008 – 2014: Early Music Aspirations ===
Park initially wanted to debut as a Korean idol, and successfully passed the audition at Starship Entertainment in 2008 to become a trainee. He trained at the agency for six years before leaving the company in early 2014 after having failed to debut with both Boyfriend in 2011 and later Monsta X in 2015. During his time at Starship, he appeared in both Sistar19's "Ma Boy" and Sistar's "Give It to Me" music videos in 2011 and 2013, respectively.

=== 2014 – 2018: Career Change to Acting & Debut as a Singer ===
After leaving Starship, Park decided to pursue an acting career. After signing with SidusHQ in mid 2014, Park made his acting debut in the drama Golden Rainbow, playing the role of Kim Young-won / Michinski Forever in the 34th episode of the series.

A rising new actor, he was later cast in major roles in Love Cells (2014), Start Again (2016) and I'm Sorry, But I Love You (2016).

Park also made his debut as a singer in 2014 with the song "After Love" (Ballad Ver.), which was included in the second soundtrack album for Love Cells.

He received an offer to participate on the second season of Produce 101 in 2017, but was unable to accept due filming another project at the time.

=== 2019 - present: Produce X 101, Growing Popularity, and Military Service ===
Park released the digital single "Still" (겨울을 걷다) in February 2019, and also contributed to the song's lyrics and music.

In March 2019, Park was revealed to be a trainee for Produce X 101. During the show's first episode on May 3, 2019, he revealed that he joined the show amidst a growing successful acting career due to wanting to try pursuing an idol career once more. He would go on to finish in 25th place with 814,160+ votes.

Upon conclusion of his time on Produce X 101, Park planned to hold a fanmeeting, titled "Stand By Me" on August 17, 2019. However, the fanmeeting would be postponed for undisclosed reasons.

In October 2019, Park was cast in the role of Lee Gwang-cheol for the 2020 OCN drama Rugal. The show was distributed internationally by Netflix.

In December 2022, Park signed with Namoo Actors.

== Personal life ==
=== Military service ===
On August 6, 2020, it was announced that Park began his military service in the Ministry of National Defense on August 10, 2020. He is expected to serve for two years as a member of the honor guard. He was discharged on February 9, 2022.

== Filmography ==
=== Film ===
Year	Title	Role	Ref.
2014	Mourning Grave	Pin-up male student 1	
2018	Champion	Je I-seum	
2023	Labang	PD Dong-ju	

=== Television series ===
Year	Title	Role	Notes	Ref.
2014	Golden Rainbow	Kim Young-won / Michinski Forever		
2015	Shine or Go Crazy	Wang Wi		
2015	Ugly Miss Young-ae 14	Park Sun-ho		
2016	Start Again	Kang Ji-wook		
2016	I'm Sorry, But I Love You	Kang Nam-goo		
2017	Hospital Ship	Kim Jae-hwan		
2018	A Poem a Day	Han Joo-yong		
2019	Best Chicken	Park Choi-go		
2020	Rugal	Lee Gwang-cheol		
2023	Delivery Man	Kim Shin-woo	Cameo	

=== Web series ===
Year	Title	Role	Ref.
2014	Love Cells	Ma Dae-choong	
2018	Love Your Glow	Kim Soo	
2022	Fantasy Spot	Inchan	

=== Television shows ===
Year	Title	Role	Ref.
2019	Produce X 101	Contestant	

=== Music video appearances ===
Year	Artist	Song	Ref.
2011	Sistar19	"Ma Boy"	
2013	Sistar	"Give It to Me"	

=== Hosting ===
Year	Title	Notes	Ref.
2022	Korean Popular Culture And Arts Awards	with Jang Ye-won	

== Discography ==
=== Singles ===
Title	Year	Peak chart positions	Sales	Album
Title	Year	KOR	Sales	Album
"Still" (겨울을 걷다)	2019	—	—N/a	Non-album single
Soundtrack appearances
"After Love" (Ballad Ver.) (사랑한 후에 (Ballad Ver.))	2014	—	—N/a	Love Cells OST Part.2
"—" denotes releases that did not chart or were not released in that region.

== Awards and nominations ==
Year	Award	Category	Nominated work	Result	Ref.
2016	35th MBC Drama Awards	Best New Actor	Start Again	Nominated	
2017	25th SBS Drama Awards	Best New Actor	I'm Sorry, But I Love You	Nominated	
