= Lady Wolgyeongwon =

Royal consort of Goryeo (fl. 10th century)

Royal consort of Goryeo
- Predecessor: Lady Uiseongbuwon
- Successor: Lady Mongryangwon
- Born: Unknown; Pyeongsan, North Hwanghae Province
- Died: Unknown; Pyeongsan, North Hwanghae Province
- Spouse: Taejo of Goryeo
- House: Pyeongsan Bak (by birth); House of Wang (by marriage)
- Father: Bak Su-mun (박수문)
- Religion: Buddhism

Korean name
- Hangul: 월경원부인
- Hanja: 月鏡院夫人
- Lit.: Lady of the Wolgyeong Courtyard
- RR: Wolgyeongwon buin
- MR: Wŏlgyŏngwŏn puin

Lady Wolgyeongwon of the Pyeongsan Bak clan (Korean: 월경원부인 박씨; Hanja: 月鏡院夫人 朴氏) was the daughter of Bak Su-mun who became the 28th wife of Taejo of Goryeo. Her aunt became his 26th wife and her cousin became his 29th wife.
