= Court Lady Aeiju =

Palace Lady Aeiju
- Spouse: Hyejong of Goryeo
- Issue: Wang Je; Lady Myeonghye
- House: Disputed between "Gaeseong Yŏn" or "Gyeongju Yŏn" (by birth)
- Father: Yŏn Ye
- Religion: Buddhism

Korean name
- Hangul: 궁인 애이주
- Hanja: 宮人 哀伊主
- Revised Romanization: Gungin Aeiju
- McCune–Reischauer: Kung'in A'eich'u

Palace Lady Aeiju of the Yŏn clan (Korean: 궁인 애이주 연씨; Hanja: 宮人 哀伊主 連氏) was a concubine of King Hyejong of Goryeo.

She was a daughter of Daegan Yeon-ye, and was originally from Gyeongju. She had at least two children: Prince Wang Je, and Lady Myeonghye.
