= Lady Mongryangwon =

Royal consort of Goryeo (fl. 10th century)

Royal consort of Goryeo
- Predecessor: Lady Wolgyeongwon
- Successor: Lady Haeryangwon
- Born: Unknown; Pyeongsan, North Hwanghae Province
- Died: Unknown; Pyeongsan, North Hwanghae Province
- Spouse: Taejo of Goryeo
- House: Pyongsan Pak clan
- Father: Pak Su-gyŏng (박수경)
- Religion: Buddhism

Korean name
- Hangul: 몽량원부인
- Hanja: 夢良院夫人
- Lit.: Lady of the Mongnyang Courtyard
- RR: Mongnyangwon buin
- MR: Mongnyangwŏn puin

Lady Mongryangwon of the Pyongsan Pak clan (Korean: 몽량원부인 박씨; Hanja: 夢良院夫人 朴氏), or Lady Mongnyangwon, was the daughter of Pak Su-gyŏng who became the 29th wife of Taejo of Goryeo. Her aunt became his 26th wife and her cousin became his 28th wife. Her father was excellent in physical appearance, won every time went to war and took part in the fight against Kyŏn Hwŏn while rescued Wang Kŏn from crisis when he was surrounded by the Later Baekje armies. It was said that he was entrusted with noble title and when Wang Kŏn paid a tribute to consideration of his servants' merits, Pak Su-gyŏng specially trusted with a special gift of 200 yards (200결). Pak's families also maintained their power until the accession of Wang So. However, Wang So soon reorganized the system to strengthen the royal authority and purged the nobles which led Pak to death.
