= Lady Wolhwawon =

Royal consort of Goryeo (fl. 10th century)

Royal consort of Goryeo
- Predecessor: Lady Sinjuwon
- Successor: Lady Sohwangjuwon
- Spouse: Taejo of Goryeo
- House: House of Wang (by marriage)
- Father: Yeong-Jang (영장)
- Religion: Buddhism

Korean name
- Hangul: 월화원부인
- Hanja: 月華院夫人
- Lit.: Lady of the Wolhwa Courtyard
- RR: Wolhwawon buin
- MR: Wŏrhwawŏn puin

Lady Wolhwawon (Korean: 월화원부인; Hanja: 月華院夫人) was the daughter of Yeong-Jang who became the 24th wife of Taejo of Goryeo. There are few records left about her existence or personal details.
