= Lady Sukmok =

Royal consort of Goryeo (fl. 10th century)

Royal consort of Goryeo
- Predecessor: Lady Dongyangwon
- Successor: Lady Cheonanbuwon
- Born: Unknown; Jincheon, North Chungcheong Province
- Died: Unknown; Jincheon, North Chungcheong Province
- Spouse: Taejo of Goryeo
- Issue: Prince Wonnyeong
- House: Im clan (by birth); House of Wang (by marriage)
- Father: Im Myeong-Pil (임명필)
- Religion: Buddhism

Korean name
- Hangul: 숙목부인
- Hanja: 肅穆夫人
- RR: Sungmok buin
- MR: Sungmok puin

Lady Sukmok of the Im clan (Korean: 숙목부인 임씨; Hanja: 肅穆夫人 林氏) was the daughter of Im Myeong-Pil who became the 10th wife of Taejo of Goryeo and the mother of Crown Prince Wonnyeong. Her clan was not clear, but it was believed that she came from the Jinju Im clan (진주 임씨; 鎭川 林氏). Although Wonnyeong's wife was unrecorded, they had 1 son, Crown Prince Hyodang (효당태자) and he later died in 976 due to Wang-Seon (왕선) who murdered him as the part of a policy of revenge against the aristocratic deterrence policy.
