= Lady Sohwangjuwon =

Royal consort of Goryeo (fl. 10th century)

Royal consort of Goryeo
- Predecessor: Lady Wolhwawon
- Successor: Lady Seongmu
- Born: Unknown; Hwangju, North Hwanghae Province
- Died: Unknown
- Spouse: Taejo of Goryeo
- House: House of Wang (by marriage)
- Father: Sun-Haeng (순행)
- Religion: Buddhism

Korean name
- Hangul: 소황주원부인
- Hanja: 小黃州院夫人
- Lit.: Lady of the Little Hwangju Courtyard
- RR: Sohwangjuwon buin
- MR: Sohwangjuwŏn puin

Lady Sohwangjuwon (Korean: 소황주원부인; Hanja: 小黃州院夫人) was the daughter of Sun-Haeng who became the 24th wife of Taejo of Goryeo. Since in her name was added "Little" (소; 小), so it seems that her relative became Taejo's wife too and the most suitable was Lady Hwangjuwon. Due to this, it was presumed that Lady Sohwangjuwon also came from the Hwangju Hwangbo clan.
