= Queen Sinseong =

Silla queen (fl. 10th century)

Queen Sinseong 신성왕후
- Queen Dowager Sinseong (신성왕태후; 神成王太后)
- Born: 900; Gyeongju, North Gyeongsang Province
- Died: Kaesong
- Burial: Jeongneung tomb, Gaeseong-si, North Hwanghae Province
- Spouse: Taejo of Goryeo (m. 918)
- Issue: Anjong of Goryeo
Regnal name
- Lady Daeryangwon (대량원부인, 大良院夫人; disputed)
Posthumous name
- Sinseong (신성, 神成; "Divine and Constructive")
- House: Gyeongju Kim
- Father: Kim Ŏngnyŏm

Queen Sinseong of the Gyeongju Kim clan (Korean: 신성왕후 김씨; Hanja: 神成王后 金氏; 900–?) or formally called as Queen Dowager Sinseong (신성왕태후; 神成王太后) was a Silla royal family member as the first cousin of King Gyeongsun who became the fifth wife of Taejo of Goryeo and the mother of Anjong of Goryeo, also the grandmother of Hyeonjong of Goryeo which she later posthumously honoured as queen in 1010 under his command.

== Biography ==
=== Marriage ===
In November 935, when King Gyeongsun expressed his intention to surrendered Silla to Goryeo, Taejo sent an envoy in return this request. Taejo also wanted to married with Silla's royal member and Gyeongsun said:

"Our Uncle, Kim Ŏngnyŏm has a daughter that both of her virtue and appearance are beautiful."
"우리 백부(伯父), 김억렴(金億廉)에게 딸이 있어 덕(德)과 용모가 쌍미(雙美)한지라 이가 아니면 내정(內政)을 구비(具備)할 수 없을 것."

After this, Gyeongsun sent his older first cousin, Lady Kim to Goryeo and become the 5th wife of Taejo.

== Family ==
=== Paternal ancestors ===
Queen Sinseong was the great-great-great-granddaughter of King Munseong and the daughter of Kim Ŏngnyŏm, who was the uncle of King Gyeongsun, making her King Gyeongsun's first cousin.

Paternal Ancestors of Queen Sinseong

Kim An 김안
Kim Mingong 김민공 (biological); Munseong of Silla 신라 문성 (adoptive)
Kim Ingyŏng 김인경
Kim Ŏngnyŏm
Queen Sinseong

- Father - Kim Ŏngnyŏm (875–?)
- Mother - name unknown (875–935)
- Sibling(s)
  - Brother - Kim Yuryŏm (김유렴; 金裕廉)
- Spouse - Wang Kŏn, King Taejo of Goryeo (31 January 877 – 4 July 943)
- Issue
  - Son - Wang Uk (920 – 24 July 996)
