= Prince Hyoeun =

- Prince of Goryeo

Prince Dongyang 동양군 東陽君
- Predecessor: Title established
- Successor: Wang Rim – son
- Born: Wang Wŏn (왕원); Unknown; Kaesong, Goryeo
- Died: Unknown; Kaesong, Goryeo
- Issue: 1. Wang Rim, Prince Dongyang; 2. Wang Jeong, Duke Ongyeol
Regnal name
- Prince Dongyang (동양군; 東陽君); Grand Prince Dongyang (동양대군; 東陽大君)
- House: Wang
- Father: Taejo of Goryeo
- Mother: Lady Dongyangwon of the Pyeongsan Yu clan
- Religion: Buddhism

Korean name
- Hangul: 왕원; 왕숙
- Hanja: 王垣; 王肅
- RR: Wang Won; Wang Suk
- MR: Wang Wŏn; Wang Suk

Royal title
- Hangul: 효은태자
- Hanja: 孝隱太子
- RR: Hyoeun taeja
- MR: Hyoŭn t'aeja

Prince Hyoeun (Korean: 효은태자; Hanja: 孝隱太子), personal name Wang Wŏn (왕원; 王垣) or Wang Suk (왕숙; 王肅), also known by his title Prince Dongyang (동양군; 東陽君) and Grand Prince Dongyang (동양대군; 東陽大君) was a prince of Goryeo. He was the youngest son of Taejo of Goryeo and Lady Dongyangwon, and the 15th son of Taejo overall. Through his descendant, Wang Mi (왕미; 王亹, 1365 – ?), ninety percent of the modern day Kaesong Wang clan trace their lineage to Prince Hyoeun. He was the first grandson of Yu Tal (유달) who served as the Minister of Works (공부상서).

== Later life ==
He later was executed by his older half-brother, Wang So due to his ferocious personality and he also secretly had different thoughts with people of insignificance. Wang So also said that Hyoeun had a violent temperament and the intention of plotting a rebellion. Both of his sons, Wang Rim (왕림) and Wang Chŏng (왕정) whom at this time were too young, escaped from death and fled, hiding in a private house to survive.

=== Issue ===
1. Wang Rim, Prince Dongyang (왕림 동양군; 王琳 東陽君)
2. Wang Chŏng, Duke Ongyeol (왕정 온결공; 王禎 溫潔公; ? – March 1013) – other name was Wang Yu (왕유; 王裕); had 1 daughter, Lady Wang (왕씨) whom later married with Yang Yeo-yang (양여양) and 1 son, Wang Kyŏng-su (왕경수).

== In popular culture ==
- Portrayed by Go Dong-hyun and Park Jin-hyung in the 2002–2003 KBS TV series The Dawn of the Empire.
- Portrayed by Ji Eun-sung in the 2015 MBC TV Series Shine or Go Crazy.
- Portrayed by Yoon Sun-woo in the 2016 SBS TV Series Moon Lovers: Scarlet Heart Ryeo.
