= Jeongjong =

Jeongjong may refer to:

Korean rulers:

- Jeongjong, 3rd monarch of Goryeo (923–949)
- Jeongjong, 10th monarch of Goryeo (1018–1046)
- Jeongjong of Joseon (1357–1419), a.k.a. Yi Bang-gwa, Yi Gyeong
