= Dowager Queen Sunan =

Goryeo princess (fl. 10th century)

Dowager Queen Sunan 순안왕대비

Princess of Goryeo
- Reign: ?–?
- Predecessor: Princess Wang
- Successor: Princess Wang
- Monarch: Wang Geon, King Taejo
- Spouse
- House: House of Wang (by birth)
- Father: Taejo of Goryeo
- Mother: Lady Jeongmok of the Gangneung Wang clan
- Religion: Buddhism

Dowager Queen Sunan of the Gaeseong Wang clan (Korean: 순안왕대비 왕씨; Hanja: 順安王大妃 王氏; lit. 'Grand Royal Consort Sunan') was a Goryeo Royal Princess as the only daughter of King Taejo and Lady Jeongmok. "Sunan" means the name of Yeongju City in nowadays. The reason why she posthumously honoured as Dowager Queen (왕대비, 王大妃; "Wangdaebi") was unknown since it was not recorded in Goryeosa.
