= Shine or Go Crazy =

2015 South Korean television series

- Promotional poster
- Also known as: Shine or Be Mad
- Hangul: 빛나거나 미치거나
- RR: Binnageona michigeona
- MR: Pinnagŏna mich'igŏna
- Genre: Historical; Romance; Fantasy
- Based on: Shine or Go Crazy by Hyun Go-woon
- Written by: Kwon In-chan; Kim Sun-mi
- Directed by: So Hyung-suk; Yoon Ji-hoon
- Starring: Jang Hyuk; Oh Yeon-seo; Lee Hanee; Lim Ju-hwan
- Country of origin: South Korea
- Original language: Korean
- No. of episodes: 24

Production
- Executive producers: Lee Kang-hoon; Kim Jin-chun
- Running time: 70 minutes
- Production company: May Queen Pictures

Original release
- Network: MBC TV
- Release: January 19 – April 7, 2015

Shine or Go Crazy (Korean: 빛나거나 미치거나) is a 2015 South Korean television series based on the novel of the same name by Hyun Go-woon about the romance between a Goryeo prince and a Balhae princess. Starring Jang Hyuk, Oh Yeon-seo, Lee Hanee and Lim Ju-hwan, it aired on MBC from January 19 to April 7, 2015 on Mondays and Tuesdays at 22:00 for 24 episodes.

== Plot ==
Wang So was born a prince of Goryeo, but because a prophecy foretells that he will turn the country into a river of blood, he is exiled from the palace and shunned by the royal family. Having lost his place as the rightful heir to the throne, he lives an isolated life, and in Wang So's absence, his illegitimate half-brother Wang Uk makes an ambitious play for power.

Shin Yool is the princess of Later Balhae, and she narrowly escaped death as a child at the hands of her own people because of a prophecy that she is fated to become "the light of another nation". She and Wang So have a whirlwind marriage, and as husband and wife, begin to grow closer and fall in love.

== Cast ==
=== Main ===
- Jang Hyuk as Wang So, King Gwangjong (So-so)
  - Choi Han as young Wang So
- Oh Yeon-seo as Shin Yool / Gaebong
  - Jung Won as young Shin Yool
- Lee Hanee as Hwangbo Yeo-won
  - Choo Ye-jin as young Hwangbo Yeo-won
- Lim Ju-hwan as Wang Wook, Hwangbo Yeo-won's brother
  - Lee Hyun-bin as young Wang Wook
- Lee Deok-hwa as Wang Shik-ryum
- Ryu Seung-soo as Wang Yo, King Jeongjong
  - Lee Joon-seo as young Wang Yo
- Na In-woo as Se Won / Ho Yool
  - Jo Yong-jin as young Se Won

=== Supporting ===
==== People around Wang So ====
- Kim Roi-ha as Eun Chun, Wang So's advisor and Goryeo's best warrior
- Shin Seung-hwan as Gil Bok
  - Park Min-soo as young Gil Bok
- Ji Soo-won as Empress Dowager Yoo, Wang So and Wang Yo's mother

==== People around Shin Yool ====
- Heo Jung-min as Yang Gyoo-dal, Shin Yool's adopted big brother
- Kim Sun-young as Baek Myo
- Ahn Gil-kang as Kang Myung
- Jung Woo-shik as Kyung, Shin Yool's bodyguard
- Lee Eun-soo as Choon Ah
- Jung Jae-hyung as Na Moo, Choon Ah's son

==== People around Hwangbo Yeo-won ====
- Kim Young-sun as Yum Shil, Hwangbo Yeo-won's bodyguard

==== People around Wang Shik-ryum ====
- Kang Ki-young as Wang Poong, Wang Shik-ryum's son
- Park Hyun-woo as Park Sool, Wang Shik-ryum's loyal right-handman

==== Warriors and officials ====
- Kim Byeong-ok as Choi Ji-mong
- Woo Sang-jeon as Hwangbo Je-gong, Hwangbo Yeo-won's maternal grandfather
- Seo Bum-suk as Wang Gyo / Dae Choong-gwang, Balhae's last prince and Shin Yool's half big brother
- Kim Jin-ho as Park Soo-kyung
- Lee Jung-hoon as Yoo Kwon-yool
- Song Young-jae as Yoo Mok-won
- Ahn Suk-hwan as Kim Jong-shik (cameo)
- Choi Jae-ho as Hwang Gyoo-ee
- Kim Kwang-shik as Baek Choong-hyun

==== Royal Princes ====
- Oh Eun-chan as Wang Tae, Wang So and Wang Yo's oldest brother
- Ji Eun-sung as Wang Won
- Shin Jung-yoon as Wang Rim
- Ha Dae-ro as Wang Moon
- Yoon Dae-yong as Wang Jik
- Park Sun-ho as Wang Wi
- Yeo Eui-joo as Wang Jong

==== People in Wolhyangru ====
- Jin Seo-yeon as Geum Soon, a head gisaeng
- Na Hye-jin as Chung Ok, a gisaeng
- Lee Seo-yeon as Ryung Hwa, a gisaeng

=== Other ===
- Nam Kyung-eup as Wang Geon, King Taejo
- Kim Boop-rae as General Kwak
- Lee Si-hoo as Si-hoo
- Seo Eun as Shin Yool's mother, Balhae's royal consort
- Jo Jae-ryung as a snake-eye man
- Wi Yang-ho as a Bettor
- Choi Gwi-hwa as a Manager
- Im Kang-heon as a young servant
- Kim Moon-jin as Dan Joo
- Kim Han-sup as a nobleman from Gyeongsan
- Lee Myung-shik as Lee Jung-joo as noblemen from Geumju
- Maeng Bong-hak as a servant

== Ratings ==
Episode #	Original broadcast date	Average audience share			
Episode #	Original broadcast date	TNmS Ratings		AGB Nielsen	
Episode #	Original broadcast date	Nationwide	Seoul National Capital Area	Nationwide	Seoul National Capital Area
1	January 19, 2015	7.6%	10.1%	7.9%	8.7%
2	January 20, 2015	8.0%	10.4%	8.2%	8.8%
3	January 26, 2015	8.6%	11.9%	9.8%	11.4%
4	January 27, 2015	9.9%	12.7%	10.2%	11.7%
5	February 2, 2015	8.4%	11.0%	9.8%	11.8%
6	February 3, 2015	9.1%	12.2%	9.4%	10.8%
7	February 9, 2015	8.7%	12.2%	9.3%	10.8%
8	February 10, 2015	9.4%	12.7%	11.0%	12.3%
9	February 16, 2015	9.4%	12.9%	11.2%	13.1%
10	February 17, 2015	11.5%	15.7%	10.9%	11.9%
11	February 23, 2015	11.5%	15.5%	13.1%	15.1%
12	February 24, 2015	12.3%	16.1%	14.3%	16.4%
13	March 2, 2015	9.9%	13.4%	11.9%	14.4%
14	March 3, 2015	12.4%	16.7%	13.2%	15.4%
15	March 9, 2015	10.2%	13.9%	11.6%	13.1%
16	March 10, 2015	11.7%	15.6%	12.9%	14.9%
17	March 16, 2015	11.3%	14.7%	11.7%	12.9%
18	March 17, 2015	11.4%	15.2%	12.9%	14.2%
19	March 23, 2015	10.7%	13.9%	11.4%	12.3%
20	March 24, 2015	11.4%	14.4%	13.9%	15.3%
21	March 30, 2015	11.2%	13.6%	12.1%	13.2%
22	March 31, 2015	9.5%	12.2%	10.2%	11.4%
23	April 6, 2015	10.8%	13.5%	11.5%	13.1%
24	April 7, 2015	11.5%	14.2%	13.0%	14.4%
Average		9.8%	13.5%	11.3%	12.8%

== Awards and nominations ==
Year	Award	Category	Recipient	Result
2015	4th APAN Star Awards	Top Excellence Award, Actor in a Serial Drama	Jang Hyuk	Nominated
2015	4th APAN Star Awards	Best Supporting Actress	Lee Ha-nui	Nominated

== International broadcasts ==
- Ghana - Joy Prime
