= Prince Hyomyeong (Goryeo) =

- Hangul: 효명태자
- Hanja: 孝明太子
- RR: Hyomyeong taeja
- MR: Hyomyŏng t'aeja

Prince Hyomyeong (Korean: 효명태자; Hanja: 孝明太子) was a Korean royal prince as the second son of Taejo of Goryeo and Lady Seongmu of the Pyeongsan Bak clan. His religion was Buddhism. He died early at a young age.
