= Naju O clan =

Korean clan from South Jeolla Province

Naju O clan 나주 오씨
- Country: Korea
- Current region: Naju
- Founder: O Eon
- Connected members: Queen Janghwa
- Website: http://www.najuoh.or.kr/

Naju O clan (Korean: 나주 오씨; Hanja: 羅州 吳氏) was one of the Korean clans. Their Bon-gwan was in Naju, South Jeolla Province. According to the research in 2015, the number of Naju O clan was 18152. Their founder was O Eon. He served as government official during Goryeo period and was a descendant of O Cheom (Hanja: 吳瞻) who came over from China to Silla during Jijeung of Silla’s reign in Silla dynasty.

== See also ==
- Korean clan names of foreign origin
