= Anjong of Goryeo =

Korean Royal Prince of the 10th century

Anjong 안종 安宗
- King of Goryeo (posthumously)
- Born: Wang Uk (왕욱; 王郁); About 920 or 937; Goryeo
- Died: 24 July 996 (aged 59 or 76); Sasu-hyeon, Goryeo
- Burial: Mureung Tomb
- Spouse: Queen Dowager Hyosuk
- Issue: Princess Seongmok; Hyeonjong of Goryeo
Posthumous name
- King Heongyeong Seongdeok Hyomok Hyoui the Great 헌경성덕효목효의대왕 (憲景聖德孝穆孝懿大王)
Temple name
- Anjong (안종; 安宗)
- House: Wang
- Father: Taejo of Goryeo
- Mother: Queen Sinseong; Lady Daeryangwon

Anjong (Korean: 고려 안종; Hanja: 高麗 安宗; about 920/37–24 July 996 (Note: In the Korean calendar (lunisolar), Anjong died on 7th days 7th months of 996.)), personal name Wang Uk, was a Goryeo Royal Prince as the only child of King Taejo and Queen Sinseong. He later became the father of King Hyeonjong.

== Biography ==
After King Gyeongjong's death in 981, Queen Heonjeong started to live in her own mansion, which was close to Wang Uk's, so the two often met and spent time together. Eventually, Heonjeong had a son with him, Wang Sun (왕순; the future Hyeonjong of Goryeo), but died during childbirth.

Wang Uk was exiled to Sasu-hyeon (now Sacheon, South Korea) because of his affair with the widowed queen, who was also his niece. Wang Sun was entrusted to one of King Seongjong's nannies, but missed his father, so the king decided to send Sun to live with Wang Uk. Together, they lived in Gwiyangji until Uk's death on 24 July 996. Wang Sun returned to the capital in 997, and, when he ascended to the throne, granted a posthumous name to his father.

== Family ==
- Father: Wang Kŏn, King Taejo (877–943)
  - Grandfather: Wang Ryung (840–897)
  - Grandmother: Lady Han (850–?)
- Mother: Queen Sinseong (900–?)
  - Grandfather: Kim Ŏngnyŏm (875–?)
  - Unnamed grandmother (875–935)
- Wives and children:
  - Unknown woman (Consort Sunan – half younger sister; disputed) (920–?)
    - Grand Princess Seongmok (? – 1018)
  - Lady Hwangbo of the Hwangju Hwangbo clan (966–992), later posthumously honoured as Queen Heonjeong by her son
    - Wang Sun, Prince Daeryangwon (992–1031); became the 8th ruler of Goryeo.

== Posthumous name ==
- In April 1017 (8th year reign of King Hyeonjong), name Yi-jang (이장; 移葬) was added at first but later was removed
- One month later in May 1017, name Heon-gyeong (헌경; 憲景) was added.
- In 1021 (12th year reign of King Hyeonjong), name Hyo-mok (효목; 孝穆) and Hyo-ui (효의; 孝懿) was added.
- In April 1027 (18th year reign of King Hyeonjong), name Seong-deok (성덕; 聖德) was added to his posthumous name.

== In popular culture ==
- Portrayed by Kim Ho-jin in the 2009 KBS TV series Empress Cheonchu.
- Portrayed by Nam Joo-hyuk in the 2016 SBS TV Series Moon Lovers: Scarlet Heart Ryeo.
