= Prince Hyoje =

- Hangul: 효제태자
- Hanja: 孝悌太子
- RR: Hyoje taeja
- MR: Hyoje t'aeja

Prince Hyoje (Korean: 효제태자; Hanja: 孝悌太子) was a Korean Royal Prince as the oldest son of Taejo of Goryeo and Lady Seongmu of the Pyeongsan Bak clan. His religion was Buddhism. He died early at a young age.
