= Prince Sumyeong =

- Prince of Goryeo
- Spouse: Unknown woman
- Issue: Wang Gyu, Prince Hongdeok
- House: House of Wang
- Father: Taejo of Goryeo
- Mother: Lady Heonmok of the Gyeongju Pyeong clan
- Religion: Buddhism

Korean name
- Hangul: 수명태자
- Hanja: 壽命太子
- RR: Sumyeong taeja
- MR: Sumyŏng t'aeja

Prince Sumyeong (Korean: 수명태자; Hanja: 壽命太子) was a Korean Royal Prince as the only son of Taejo of Goryeo and Grand Lady Heonmok. From all of his father's wives, just his mother whom held the highest title around the consorts but still below the queens. Although his wife was unknown, but they had a son, Wang Gyu, Prince Hongdeok (왕규 홍덕원군).
