= Wang Jik =

Korean Royal Prince

- Hangul: 왕직
- Hanja: 王稷
- RR: Wang Jik
- MR: Wang Chik

Wang Jik (Korean: 왕직; Hanja: 王稷) was a Korean Royal Prince as the only son of Taejo of Goryeo and Lady Heungbok of the Hongju Hong clan. His religion was Buddhism and died without issue.

== In popular culture ==
- Portrayed by Yoon Dae-yong in the 2015 MBC TV Series Shine or Go Crazy.
