= Kim Hŏnch'ang =

9th century Korean aristocrat and rebel

King of Jangan
- Reign: 822
- Successor: Kim Pŏm-mun
- Died: 822; Ungju, Silla (present-day Gongju, South Korea)
- House: Kim
- Father: Kim Chu-wŏn

- Kim Hŏnch'ang
- Hangul: 김헌창
- Hanja: 金憲昌
- RR: Gim Heonchang
- MR: Kim Hŏnch'ang

Kim Hŏnch'ang (died 822) was the leader of an aristocratic rebellion in early ninth-century Unified Silla. He was a seventh-generation descendant of King Muyeol, and thus bore the "true bone" status in the Silla bone rank system. His activities are probably linked to strife between different lineages of the Silla royal house.

== Biography ==
Kim's father, Kim Chuwŏn, was first in line to take the Silla throne after the death of King Seondeok. However, Kim Kyŏngsin seized power by military force and became King Wonseong. Kim Chuwŏn fled to the province of Myeongju, around modern-day Gangneung. These events probably laid the foundation for his son's (and grandson's) rebellious activities. Kim Hŏnch'ang later became the governor of Ungju (modern-day Gongju) in 821.

After King Aejang was slain by Kim Ŏnsŭng, who then became king, Kim Hŏnch'ang launched a rebellion which rapidly gained control over the modern-day areas of Gwangju, Cheongju, and Gongju. He named his country Jangan (장안, 長安) and took the era name Kyŏngun (경운, 慶雲). The rebellion went on to seize Jeonju, Sangju, Chungju, and Gimhae, thus gaining control over much of the southern and western Korean peninsula. It appears that he was aided by many other members of the Muyeol lineage.

After a month's fighting, the royal faction was able to regain much of the territory that Kim Hŏnch'ang's forces had taken. With the fall of Ungju imminent, which had been the center of the rebellion, Kim Hŏnch'ang killed himself to avoid capture by the royal army. His loyal followers beheaded his corpse and buried the head and body separately to protect Kim's corpse from desecration by the enemy. However, the royalist army was able to find both pieces of Kim's corpse after the fall of the city. In the aftermath of his failed rebellion, 239 relatives of Kim Hŏnch'ang were executed.

Three years later, his son Kim Pŏmmun rekindled the rebellion, but was shortly thereafter also crushed by the royal army.

== See also ==
- Unified Silla
- History of Korea
