= Prince Wonjang =

- Prince of Goryeo
- Spouse: Princess Heungbang
- Issue: Prince Heungbang; Lady Daemyeong
- House: House of Wang
- Father: Taejo of Goryeo
- Mother: Queen Jeongdeok of the Chŏngju Yu clan
- Religion: Buddhism

Prince Wonjang (Korean: 원장태자; Hanja: 元莊太子) was a Goryeo Royal Prince as the third son of King Taejo and Queen Jeongdeok who married his half sister, Princess Heungbang and had a son and a daughter who would become King Gyeongjong's 5th wife.
