= Wang Je =

- Prince of Goryeo
Names
- Surname: Wang (왕, 王); Given name: Je / Che (제, 濟)
- House: House of Wang
- Father: Hyejong of Goryeo
- Mother: Palace Lady Aeiju of the Yeon clan
- Religion: Buddhism

Korean name
- Hangul: 왕제
- Hanja: 王濟
- RR: Wang Je
- MR: Wang Che

Wang Je (Korean: 왕제; Hanja: 王濟) was a Goryeo royal prince and the only son of King Hyejong and Lady Yeon. There are few records about his life.
