= Queen Jeongdeok =

Korean queen (fl. 10th century)

Queen Jeongdeok 정덕왕후
- Born: ? Chŏngju
- Spouse: Taejo of Goryeo
- Issue: Prince Wangwi; Prince Inae; Prince Wonjang; Prince Joyi; Queen Munhye; Queen Seonui; A daughter
- House: Chŏngju Yu clan
- Father: Yu Deok-yeong (유덕영)

Queen Jeongdeok of the Chŏngju Yu clan (Korean: 정덕왕후 유씨; Hanja: 貞德王后 柳氏) was the sixth wife of Taejo of Goryeo who came from the same clan as his first wife and bore him seven children. Through her two elder daughters' marriages, she established ties with the powerful Chungju Yu and Hwangju Hwangbo clan, becoming the maternal grandmother of Queen Heonui, King Seongjong, Queen Heonae, and Queen Heonjeong.
