= Hyejong of Goryeo =

King of Goryeo from 943 to 945

Hyejong

King of Goryeo
- Reign: 4 July 943–23 October 945
- Coronation: 943; Kaegyŏng, Goryeo
- Predecessor: Taejo
- Successor: Jeongjong
- Born: Wang Mu; 912; Queen Janghwa's manor, Mokpo, Naju, Taebong
- Died: 23 October 945 (aged 32–33); Junggwang Hall, Kaegyŏng, Goryeo
- Burial: Sulleung (순릉; 順陵)
- Queen Consort: Queen Uihwa
- Consort: Lady Hugwangjuwon; Lady Cheongjuwon; Palace Lady Aeiju
- Issue: Sons: Prince Heunghwa Crown Prince Wang-je; Daughters: Lady Gyeonghwa Princess Jeongheon Lady Myeonghye
Posthumous name
- Great King Indeok Myeonghyo Seonhyeon Uigong (인덕명효선현의공대왕, 仁德明孝宣顯義恭大王; original); Great King Gyeongheon Gopyeong Seonhyeon Myeonghyo Uigong (견헌고평선현명효의공대왕, 景憲高平宣顯明孝義恭大王; final)
Temple name
- Hyejong (혜종; 惠宗)
- House: Wang
- Dynasty: Goryeo
- Father: Taejo of Goryeo
- Mother: Queen Janghwa

Korean name
- Hangul: 왕무
- Hanja: 王武
- RR: Wang Mu
- MR: Wang Mu

Monarch name
- Hangul: 혜종
- Hanja: 恵宗
- RR: Hyejong
- MR: Hyejong

Courtesy name
- Hangul: 승건
- Hanja: 承乾
- RR: Seunggeon
- MR: Sŭnggŏn

Posthumous name
- Hangul: 의공대왕
- Hanja: 義恭大王
- RR: Uigong daewang
- MR: Ŭigong taewang

Hyejong (912 – 23 October 945), personal name Wang Mu, was the second king of the Goryeo dynasty of Korea. He was preceded by King Taejo and succeeded by King Jeongjong.

== Early life ==
Hyejong was born to King Taejo and his second wife, Janghwa of the "Oh" clan. She was the daughter of the Magistrate of Naju, O Ta-ryŏn. Taejo met and married her while serving in Naju as a general of Taebong under Gung Ye.

In 921, Hyejong was proclaimed Crown Prince and Royal Successor with support from General Bak Sul-Hui. Almost immediately after being named Crown Prince, Hyejong followed his father Taejo into battle against Later Baekje and played a major role in numerous victories. In 943, Hyejong rose to the throne upon his father's death.

== Reign ==
Hyejong's reign was marked with conspiracy and power struggles among Taejo's sons. The first of these conspiracies was led by Princes Wang Yo and Wang So, sons of Taejo and his third consort, Queen Sinmyeongsunseong of the Chungju Yu clan, which possessed considerable political influence. Upon realizing the conspiracy by the two princes, Wang Gyu warned Hyejong of the conspiracy, but plotted to put his grandson, one of Hyejong's younger half-brothers, on the throne when Hyejong did nothing to stop the conspiracy of the two princes.

== Death ==
Hyejong died in 945, during the second year of his reign from mercury poisoning in his bath water. He had eczema, which caused red itchy patches on his skin and difficulty breathing. Although he had a son who was named crown prince, he was succeeded by his third brother Wang Yo, who claimed the throne by force with the backing of their fourth brother Wang So and subsequently crowned as Jeongjong.

== Family ==
- Father: Taejo of Goryeo
  - Grandfather: Wang Ryung, King Wimu the Great
  - Grandmother: Queen Wisuk of the Han clan
- Mother: Queen Janghwa of the Naju Oh clan
  - Grandfather: Oh Da-ryeon, Prince Daryeon
  - Grandmother: Lady Yeon Deok-gyo
- Consorts and their Respective Issue(s):
1. Queen Uihwa of the Jincheon Im clan
  1. Prince Heunghwa, 1st son
  2. Lady Gyeonghwa, 1st daughter
  3. Princess Jeongheon, 2nd daughter
2. Lady Hugwangjuwon of the Gangneung Wang clan – No issue.
3. Lady Cheongjuwon of the Cheongju Kim clan – No issue.
4. Palace Lady Aeiju, of the Yeon clan
  1. Wang Je, 2nd son
  2. Lady Myeonghye, 3rd daughter

== In popular culture ==
- Portrayed by Ahn Jung-hoon and Seo Hyun-suk in the 2000–2002 KBS1 TV series Taejo Wang Geon.
- Portrayed by No Young-gook in the 2002–2003 KBS1 TV series The Dawn of the Empire.
- Portrayed by Kim San-ho in the 2016 SBS TV series Moon Lovers: Scarlet Heart Ryeo.

Hyejong of Goryeo House of Wang Born: 912 Died: 23 October 945
Regnal titles
Preceded by Taejo	King of Goryeo; 943–945	Succeeded by Jeongjong (定宗)
