= Kim Chuwŏn =

Silla royal family member (fl. 8th century)

- Hangul: 김주원
- Hanja: 金周元
- RR: Gim Juwon
- MR: Kim Chuwŏn

Kim Chuwŏn (Korean: 김주원; Hanja: 金周元) was a relative of King Hyegong of Silla and the founder of Gangneung Kim.

== Biography ==
Kim Chuwŏn was the son of gakgan Kim Yujŏng (김유정; 金惟靖), who was a descendant of the third son of King Taejong Muyeol, Kim Munwang. After the death of Hyegong of Silla in 780, Kim Chuwŏn, who was one of the pretenders to the throne of Silla, failed to arrive in the capital in time, due to heavy rains. This was interpreted as a bad omen, and his popularity declined. The throne was seized by Wonseong of Silla.

To appease Kim Chuwŏn, Wonseong gave him a fief or sigŭp (식읍; 食邑) and the title of wang of Myeongju, and gave the position of a Prime Minister to his son, Kim Hŏnch'ang. Kim Hŏnch'ang would however rebel against royal authority in 822.

== Ancestry ==
Patrilineal descent from King Muyeol
1. King Muyeol of Silla
2. Kim Munwang (김문왕; 金文王)
3. Kim Taech'ung (김대충; 金大忠)
4. Kim Sain (김사인; 金思仁)
5. Kim Yujŏng (김유정; 金惟靖)
6. Kim Chuwŏn

== Sources ==
- Joanna Rurarz (2009). Historia Korei. Dialog. p. 139. ISBN 978-83-89899-28-6.
