= Taejo of Goryeo =

King of Goryeo from 918 to 943

Taejo 태조 太祖
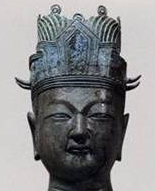

King of Goryeo
- Reign: 25 July 918 – 4 July 943
- Coronation: 918; Pojeong Hall, Cheorwon Gate, Taebong
- Predecessor: Dynasty established: Kung Ye as the King of Later Goguryeo
- Successor: Hyejong of Goryeo
- Born: Wang Kŏn; 31 January 877; Yonggeon's manor, Songak County, Hansan-ju, Silla
- Died: 4 July 943 (aged 66); Sindeok Hall, Gaegyeong, Goryeo
- Burial: Hyeolleung Royal Tomb
- Queen Consort: Queen Sinhye; Queen Janghwa; Queen Sinmyeong; Queen Sinjeong; Queen Sinseong; Queen Jeongdeok
- Consort: Grand Lady Heonmok; Lady Jeongmok; Lady Dongyangwon; Lady Sukmok; Lady Cheonanbuwon; Lady Heungbokwon; Lady Daeryangwon; Lady Hudaeryangwon; Lady Daemyeongjuwon; Lady Gwangjuwon; Lady Sogwangjuwon; Lady Dongsanwon; Lady Yehwa; Lady Daeseowon; Lady Soseowon; Lady Seojeonwon; Lady Sinjuwon; Lady Wolhwawon; Lady Sohwangjuwon; Lady Seongmu; Lady Uiseongbuwon; Lady Wolgyeongwon; Lady Mongryangwon; Lady Haeryangwon
- Issue: Sons: Wang Mu Wang Tae Wang Yo Wang So Wang Jeong Jeungtongguksa Wang Uk Wang Uk Prince Wangwi Prince Inae Prince Wonjang Prince Joyi Prince Sumyeong Wang Ui Wang Won Prince Wonnyeong Wang Imju Prince Hyoji Wang Jik Prince Gwangjuwon Prince Hyoje Prince Hyomyeong Prince Beopdeung Prince Jari Grand Prince Uiseongbuwon; Daughters: Princess Nakrang Princess Heungbang Queen Daemok Queen Munhye Queen Seonui Princess Wang Grand Consort Sunan Princess Wang Princess Wang
Era name and dates
- Cheonsu (천수; 天授): 918–933
Posthumous name
- Great King Eungun Wonmyeong Gwangnyeol Daejeong Yedeok Janghyo Wimok Sinseong (응운원명광렬대정예덕장효위목신성대왕, 應運元明光烈大定睿德章孝神聖大王; original); Great King Yongyeol Inyong Janghyo Daejeong Gwangyeol Wonmyeong Sinseong (용열인용장효대정광열원명신성대왕, 勇烈仁勇章孝大定光烈元明神聖大王; final)
Temple name
- Taejo (태조; 太祖)
- House: Wang
- Dynasty: Goryeo
- Father: Wang Ryung
- Mother: Lady Han

- Korean name
- Hangul: 왕건
- Hanja: 王建
- RR: Wang Geon
- MR: Wang Kŏn

Monarch name
- Hangul: 태조
- Hanja: 太祖
- RR: Taejo
- MR: T'aejo

Courtesy name
- Hangul: 약천
- Hanja: 若天
- RR: Yakcheon
- MR: Yakch'ŏn

Posthumous name
- Hangul: 신성대왕
- Hanja: 神聖大王
- RR: Sinseong daewang
- MR: Sinsŏng taewang

Taejo (Korean: 태조; Hanja: 太祖; 31 January 877 – 4 July 943), personal name Wang Kŏn (왕건; 王建), also known as Taejo Wang Kŏn (태조 왕건; 太祖 王建; lit. ''Great Progenitor Wang Kŏn''), was the founder of the Goryeo Dynasty of Korea. He ruled from 918 to 943, achieving unification of the Later Three Kingdoms in 936.

== Background ==
Wang Kŏn was born in 877 to a powerful maritime merchant family of Goguryeo descent based in Songak (modern Kaesong) as the eldest son of Wang Ryung. According to the Pyeonnyeon tongnok (편년통록; 編年通錄), quoted in the Goryeosa, Wang Kŏn's grandfather Chakchegon was the son of Emperor Suzong of Tang. According to the Encyclopedia of Korean Culture and the Doosan Encyclopedia, this is hagiographical. The Pyeonnyeon tongnok (c. late 12th century) said: While on a sea voyage to meet his father, Emperor Suzong of the Tang dynasty, 16-year-old Chakchegon encountered a dragon king, slew a shape-shifting fox, and married a dragon woman; the dragon woman later transformed into a dragon and went away. According to the Seongwollok (성원록; 聖源錄), quoted in the Goryeosa, the "dragon woman" was a daughter of Tu Ŭn-chŏm from Pyongju (modern-day Pyongsan County). The story that Wang Kŏn was descended from either Suzong or Xuanzong was dismissed by the Joseon compilers of the Goryeosa. Modern historians believe that Wang Kŏn's ancestors were influential Goguryeoic hojoks (lords) that conducted maritime trade with China for generations. According to the Gaoli tujing (c. early 12th century) written by the Song dynasty envoy Xu Jing, Wang Kŏn's ancestors were Goguryeo nobility. According to Jang Deokho, his ancestors were Goguryeo refugees who settled around Songak, accumulating great wealth through maritime trade and gaining control of the region, including the Ryesong River. During the Later Silla period, the northern regions, including Songak, were the strongholds of Goguryeo refugees, and Wang Kŏn's hometown of Songak would become the original capital of Later Goguryeo in 901.

According to a document created during the reign of King Uijong of Goryeo, the Sillan monk Doseon prophesied that Wang Kŏn would rise to power and become king after visiting Wang Kŏn's father.

== Rise to power ==
Wang Kŏn began his career in the turbulent Later Three Kingdoms. In the later years of Silla, many local leaders and bandits rebelled against the rule of Queen Jinseong, who did not have strong and wise enough leadership or policies to improve the poor condition of the people. Among those rebels, Kung Ye of the northwestern region and Kyŏn Hwŏn of the southwest gained more power. They defeated and absorbed many of the other rebel groups as their troops marched against local Silla officials and bandits. In 895, Kung Ye led his forces into the far northwestern part of Silla, where Songdo was located. Taejo's father, Wang Ryung, along with many local clans, quickly surrendered to Kung Ye. Wang Kŏn followed his father into service under Kung Ye, the future leader of Taebong, and he began his service under Kung Ye's command.

Wang Kŏn's ability as a military commander was soon recognized by Kung Ye, who promoted him to general and even regarded him as his brother. In 900, he led a successful campaign against local clans and the army of Later Baekje in the Chungju area, gaining more fame and recognition from the king. In 903, he led a famous naval campaign against the southwestern coastline of Later Baekje at Keumsung, later Naju, while Kyon Hwon was at war against Silla. He led several more military campaigns, and also helped conquered people who lived in poverty under Silla rule. The public favored him due to his leadership and generosity.

In 913, he was appointed as prime minister of the newly renamed Taebong. Its king, Kung Ye, whose leadership helped found the kingdom but who began to refer to himself as the Buddha, began to persecute people who expressed their opposition against his religious arguments. He executed many monks, then later even his own wife and two sons, and the public began to turn away from him. His costly rituals and harsh rule caused even more opposition.

== Rise to the throne and founding of Goryeo ==
In the night of July 24, 918, four top-ranked generals of Taebong—Hong Yu (홍유; 洪儒), Pae Hyŏn-gyŏng (배현경; 裵玄慶), Sin Sung-gyŏm and Pok Chigyŏm (복지겸; 卜智謙)—met secretly and agreed to overthrow Kung Ye's rule and crown Wang Kŏn as their new king. Wang Kŏn first opposed the idea but later agreed to their plan. Kung Ye was overthrown in a coup and killed near the capital, Cheorwon. On the sunrise of the next day, the generals installed Wang Kŏn as the new king. Taejo renamed the kingdom Goryeo, thus beginning the Goryeo Dynasty. The next year he moved the capital back to his hometown, Gaegyeong.

He promoted Buddhism as Goryeo's national religion, and laid claim to the northern parts of the Korean Peninsula and Manchuria, which he considered his rightful legacy as the successor of Goguryeo. According to the Goryeosa, in 918, the ancient capital of Pyongyang had been in ruins for a long time and foreign barbarians were using the surrounding lands as hunting grounds and occasionally raiding the borders of Goryeo; therefore, in his first year as king, Wang Kŏn ordered his subjects to repopulate the ancient capital, and soon sent his cousin Wang Sing-nyŏm to defend it. Afterward, he decreed Pyongyang as the Western Capital. He also sought alliances and cooperation with local clans rather than trying to conquer and bring them under his direct control.

== The War of the Later Three Kingdoms ==
In 927, Kyon Hwon of Later Baekje led his forces into Silla's capital, Gyeongju, capturing and executing its king, King Gyeongae. Then he established King Gyeongsun as his puppet monarch before he turned his army toward Goryeo. Hearing of the news, Taejo planned a strike with 5,000 cavalrymen to attack Kyon's troops on the way back home at Gongsan near Daegu in the Battle of Gongsan. He met the Later Baekje army and suffered a disastrous defeat, losing most of his army including his generals Kim Nak and Sin Sung-gyom, the very same man who crowned Wang as a king. According to the legend, Taejo and Sin Sung-gyom exchanged their armor so that the king would be able to escape the battlefield. While Wang Kŏn escaped the battlefield, Sin and the remaining army fought bravely against the Later Baekje army. But eventually his army was routed and in the woods Sin was shot with arrows and was killed by the enemy. Taejo escaped from this mountain and fled alone to the mountain Apsan, and he spent a few days hiding in a large cave at the peak of Apsan. While Taejo retreated from the battle and fled to Apsan Mountain, he left many place names related to him in Daegu. However, Goryeo quickly recovered from defeat and successfully defended Later Baekje's attack on its front.

In 935, the last king of Silla, King Gyeongsun, felt there was no way to revive his kingdom and surrendered his entire land to Taejo. Taejo gladly accepted his surrender and gave him the title of prince, and accepted his first cousin as his fifth wife and queen (Wang had six queens, and many more wives as he married daughters of every single local leader). In turn, King Gyeonsun married King Taejo's eldest daughter, Princess Nakrang, whose daughter also intermarried into the royal Wang clan through her marriage with King Gyeongjong; the grandson of King Taejo and Queen Sinmyeong.

It caused much disgust to Kyon Hwon. Kyon's father, Ajagae, who held his own claim to the Sangju region, also defected and surrendered to Goryeo and was received as the father of a king.

In the same year, Kyon Hwon's oldest son, Kyŏn Sin-gŏm, led a coup with his brothers Yang-gŏm and Yong-gŏm, against their father, who favored their half-brother, Kŭm-gang, as his successor to the throne. Kyon Hwon was sent into exile and imprisoned in the temple of Geumsansa, but escaped to Goryeo and was treated like Taejo's father, who died just before his surrender.

== Goryeo victory and unification ==
In 936, Wang led his final campaign against Sin-gom of Later Baekje. Sin-gom fought against Taejo, but facing much disadvantage and inner conflict, he surrendered to Taejo. Wang finally conquered Later Baekje, and unified the nation for the second time since Unified Silla; he ruled until 943, and died from disease.

Taejo sought to bring even his enemies into his ruling coalition. He gave titles and land to rulers and nobles from the various countries he had defeated: Later Baekje, Silla, and also Balhae, which disintegrated around the same time. Thus he sought to secure stability and unity for his kingdom which had been lacking in the later years of Silla.

After the destruction of Balhae by the Khitans in 926, Balhae's last crown prince and much of its ruling class sought refuge in Goryeo, where they were warmly welcomed and included into the ruling family by Taejo, thus uniting the two successor nations of Goguryeo. Taejo felt a strong familial kinship with Balhae, calling it his "Relative Country" and "Married Country", and protected Balhae refugees, many of whom were also of Goguryeo origin. This was in strong contrast to Later Silla, which had endured a hostile relationship with Balhae.

Taejo displayed strong animosity toward the Khitans who had destroyed Balhae. The Liao dynasty sent 30 envoys with 50 camels as a gift in 942, but he exiled the envoys and starved the camels under a bridge in retribution for Balhae, despite the major diplomatic repercussions. Taejo proposed to Gaozu of Later Jìn that they attack the Khitans as revenge for the destruction of Balhae, according to the Zizhi Tongjian. Furthermore, in his Ten Injunctions to his descendants, he stated that the Khitans are no different from beasts and should be guarded against.

== Legacy ==
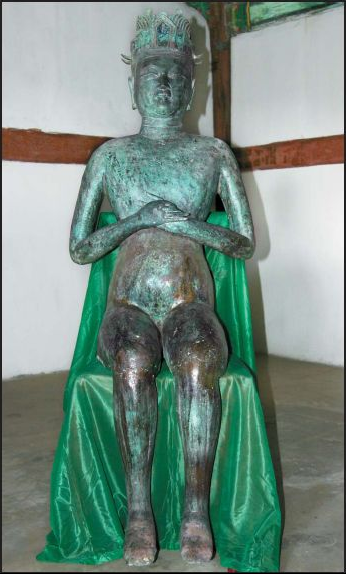
Life-sized bronze statue of Taejo, constructed in 951, discovered in 1992 at Kaesong

The unification of the Later Three Kingdoms in 936 was very important in Korean history; the unification of 668 CE by Silla was only a unification of approximately half of the peoples of the Korean Peninsula and its vicinity (who at the time largely considered themselves one people divided among many states), since the northern part was ruled by Balhae, which asserted itself as a reincarnation of Goguryeo. However, Wang Kŏn's unification in 936 was a more complete unification (in which only a single state emerged among the people, as opposed to the 7th century, when two, Unified Silla and Balhae, emerged); the people of the Korean Peninsula thereafter remained under a single, unified state until 1948, when Korea was divided into north and south by Soviets and U.S. forces.

The modern name of "Korea" is derived from the name "Goryeo," which itself is derived from "Goguryeo," to whose heritage (and by extension, territory) Wang Kŏn and his new kingdom laid claim. As the first ruler to more fully unite the people of the Korean Peninsula under a single state, many modern-day Koreans look to his example for applicability to the current state of division on the Korean Peninsula.

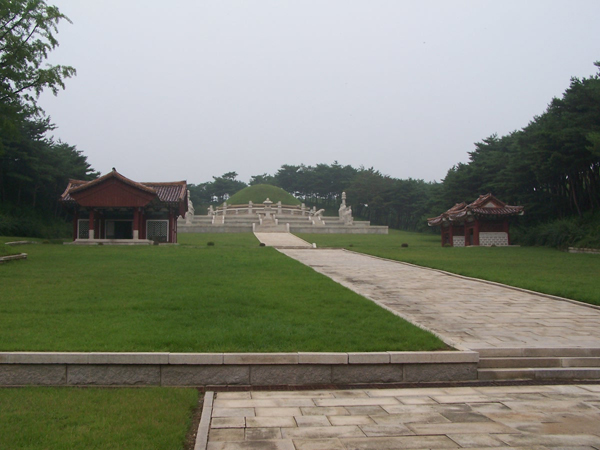
Tomb of Wang Kŏn

During the early Goryeo dynasty, the title of t'aeja (태자; 太子) was only a peerage title for sons of the king; a separate title existed for the heir apparent called the chŏngyun (정윤; 正尹).

== Family ==
- Father: King Sejo of Goryeo (850–897)
  - Grandfather: King Uijo of Goryeo (b. 822)
    - Great-grandfather: King Gukjo of Goryeo (810–859)
    - Great-grandmother: Gang Jin-ui, Queen Jeonghwa of the Sincheon Gang clan (b. 803)
  - Grandmother: Jeo-Min-Ui, Queen Wonchang (b. 822)
- Mother: Queen Wisuk of the Han clan
- Consorts and their Respective Issue(s):
1. Queen Sinhye of the Chŏngju Yu clan – No issue.
2. Queen Janghwa of the Naju O clan
  1. Crown Prince Wang Mu, 1st son
3. Queen Sinmyeongsunseong of the Chungju Yu clan
  1. Princess Nakrang, 1st daughter
  2. Wang Tae, 2nd son
  3. Wang Yo, 3rd son
  4. Wang So, 4th son
  5. Wang Jeong, 5th son
  6. Jeungteong, 6th son – a monk.
  7. Princess Heungbang, 2nd daughter
4. Queen Sinjeong of the Hwangju Hwangbo clan
  1. Wang Uk, King Daejong of Goryeo, 7th son
  2. Queen Daemok, 3rd daughter
5. Queen Sinseong of the Gyeongju Kim clan
  1. Wang Uk, King Anjong of Goryeo, 8th son
6. Queen Jeongdeok of the Chŏngju Yu clan
  1. Prince Wangwi, 9th son
  2. Prince Inae, 10th son
  3. Prince Wonjang, 11th son
  4. Prince Joyi, 12th son
  5. Queen Munhye, 4th daughter
  6. Queen Seonui, 5th daughter
  7. 6th daughter
7. Grand Lady Heonmok of the Gyeongju Pyeong clan
  1. Prince Sumyeong, 13th son
8. Lady Jeongmok of the Gangneung Wang clan
  1. Grand Royal Consort Sunan, 7th daughter
9. Lady Dongyangwon of the Pyeongsan Yu clan
  1. Wang Ui, Prince Hyomok, 14th son
  2. Wang Won, Prince Hyoeun, 15th son
10. Lady Sukmok of the Jinju Im clan
  1. Prince Wonnyeong, 16th son
11. Lady Cheonanbuwon of the Gyeongju Im clan
  1. Wang Imju, Prince Hyoseong, 17th son
  2. Prince Hyoji, 18th son
12. Lady Heungbokwon of the Hongju Hong clan
  1. Wang Jik, 19th son
  2. 8th daughter
13. Lady Hudaeryangwon of the Yi clan / Lady Daeryangwon of the Yi clan (disputed)
  1. 9th daughter
14. Lady Daemyeongjuwon of the Gangneung Wang clan – No issue.
15. Lady Gwangjuwon of the Wang clan – No issue.
16. Lady Sogwangjuwon of the Wang clan
  1. Prince Gwangjuwon, 20th son
17. Lady Dongsanwon of the Suncheon Bak clan – No issue.
18. Lady Yehwa of the Haeju Wang clan – No issue.
19. Lady Daeseowon of the Dongju Kim clan – No issue.
20. Lady Soseowon of the Dongju Kim clan – No issue.
21. Lady Seojeonwon – No issue.
22. Lady Sinjuwon of the Sincheon Gang clan – No issue.
23. Lady Wolhwawon – No issue.
24. Lady Sohwangjuwon – No issue.
25. Lady Seongmu of the Pyeongsan Bak clan
  1. Prince Hyoje, 21st son
  2. Prince Hyomyeong, 22nd son
  3. Prince Beopdeung, 23rd son
  4. Prince Jari, 24th son
  5. 10th daughter
26. Lady Uiseongbuwon of the Uiseong Hong clan
  1. Grand Prince Uiseongbuwon, 25th son
27. Lady Wolgyeongwon of the Pyeongsan Bak clan – No issue.
28. Lady Mongryangwon of the Pyongsan Bak clan – No issue.
29. Lady Haeryangwon – No issue.

== Popular culture ==
- Portrayed by Kim Myeong-jin in the 1970 film Wang-geon, the Great.
- Portrayed by Choi Soo-jong and Oh Hyun-chul in the 2000–2002 KBS1 TV series Taejo Wang Geon.
- Portrayed by Lee Mun-soo in the 2002–2003 KBS TV series The Dawn of the Empire.
- Portrayed by Joo Myung Nam in the 2009 KBS TV series Empress Cheonchu.
- Portrayed by Nam Kyung-eup in the 2015 MBC TV series Shine or Go Crazy.
- Portrayed by Jo Min-ki in the 2016 SBS TV series Moon Lovers: Scarlet Heart Ryeo.
- In the 2018 Channel A program Thousand Days Unofficial History - Episode 73 (ko)
- Leads the Korean civilization the games Sid Meier's Civilization III and IV
- In the 2022 musical Taejo Wang Geon

== See also ==
- Family tree of the Goryeo Dynasty
- Rulers of Korea
- History of Korea
- Wang (family name)
- Tomb of King Wanggon
- Founding legends of the Goryeo royal family
- Taejo Wang Geon (TV series)

Taejo of Goryeo House of Wang Born: 31 January 877 Died: 4 July 943
Regnal titles
| Preceded by Kung Ye as King of Later Goguryeo | King of Goryeo; 918–943 | Succeeded by Hyejong |
Political offices
| New office | Prime Minister of Taebong; 913–918 | Office abolished |
