= 14th century in philosophy =

This is a timeline of philosophy-related events in the 14th century.

== Events ==
- 1324 - William of Ockham was ordered to Avignon to defend his interpretation of Peter Lombard's Sentences (1150) before the papal court.
- 1365 - The University of Vienna was founded by Rudolf IV, Duke of Austria.
- 1370 - A Vietnamese Confucian mandarin, Lê Quát, unsuccessfully attempted to have Buddhism, the favoured religion of the Trần dynasty, declared heretical.
- 1384 - Ibn Khaldun became Professor of the Qamhiyyah Madrasah in Egypt.

== Publications ==
- 1323 - The Summa Logicae, William of Ockham.
- 1377 - The Muqaddimah, Ibn Khaldun.
- 1390 - Iphak doseol, Kwŏn Kŭn.
- 1397 - Sambong chip, Chŏng Tojŏn.

== Births ==
- 1320 - Albert of Saxony (d.1390), German philosopher and mathematician.
- 1328 - Yi Saek (d.1396), Korean writer, poet and philosopher at Sungkyunkwan academy.
- 1332 - Ibn Khaldun (d.1406), Arab Islamic scholar, philosopher, historian and sociologist.
- 1337 - Chŏng Mong-ju (d.1392), Korean statesman, diplomat, philosopher, poet, calligrapher and reformist of the Goryeo period.
- 1342 - Chŏng Tojŏn (d.1398), Korean scholar-official during the late Goryeo to the early Joseon periods.
- 1352 - Kwŏn Kŭn (d.1409), one of the first Neo-Confucian scholars of the Joseon dynasty.
- 1353 - Kil Chae (d.1419), Korean scholar-official near the end of the Goryeo dynasty.
- 1380 - Nguyễn Trãi (d. 1442), Vietnamese Confucian scholar, poet and politician.
- 1396 - Chŏng Inji (d.1478), Korean historian and Neo-Confucian scholar.

== Deaths ==
- 1306 - An Hyang (b.1243), Korean Confucian scholar.
- 1308 - John Duns Scotus (b.1255/6), Scottish Catholic priest and Franciscan friar, university professor, philosopher and theologian.
- 1316 - Pietro d'Abano (b.1357 (Note: Date of birth also given as 1246 and 1250.)), Italian philosopher, astrologer, physician and professor of medicine in Padua.
- 1316 - Ramon Llull, philosopher, theologian and poet from Parma.
- 1317 (Note: Date of death also given as 1278.) - Purna Prajna (b.1278 (Note: Date of birth also given as 1199.)), Indian philosopher, theologian and proponent of the Dvaita school of Vedanta.
- 1322 - Petrus Aureoli (b.1280), scholastic philosopher and theologian.
- 1328 - Meister Eckhart (b.1260), German Catholic priest, theologian, philosopher and mystic.
- 1333 - Wú Chéng (b.1249), Neo-Confucian thinker in the late Song dynasty and Yuan dynasty.
- 1342 - U T'ak, (b.1262), Korean Neo-Confucian scholar and philosopher during the Goryeo dynasty.
- 1345 - Cheng Duanli (b.1271), Neo-Confucian scholar of the Yuan Dynasty.
- 1347 - Abner of Burgos (b.1270), Castilian polemical writer and Jewish philosopher who converted to Christianity.
- 1347 - William of Ockham (b.1287), Franciscan friar, scholastic philosopher, apologist, and theologian from Surrey.
- 1358 - Adam of Wodeham (b.1298), English philosopher and theologian.
- 1370 - Chu Văn An (b.1292), Confucian, teacher, physician, and high-ranking mandarin of the Trần dynasty in Đại Việt.
- 1390 - Albert of Saxony (b.1320), German philosopher and mathematician.
- 1391 - Mādhavācārya (b.1296), Indian scholar usually identified with Vidyaranya, the jagadguru of the Sringeri Sharada Peetham from 1374-1380 until 1386.
- 1392 - Chŏng Mong-ju (b.1337), Korean statesman, diplomat, philosopher, poet, calligrapher and reformist of the Goryeo period.
- 1396 - Yi Saek (b.1328), Korean, writer, poet and philosopher at Sungkyunkwan academy.
- 1398 - Chŏng Tojŏn (b.1342), Korean scholar-official during the late Goryeo to the early Joseon periods.

== See also ==
- List of centuries in philosophy
