= List of Korean philosophers =

This is a sortable list of Korean philosophers.

== List ==
Three Kingdoms

- Woncheuk 원측 圓測 (613–696)
- Wonhyo 원효 元曉 (617–686) see Essence-Function
- Uisang 의상 義湘 (625–702)
- Seol Chong 설총 薛聰 (650–730)

Goryeo

Name	Hangul	Art name		Hanja	Dates
Wang Hu	왕후	Ŭich'ŏn	의천	王煦 義天	1055–1101
Jinul	지눌		보조	普照 知訥	1158–1210
Kim Pusik	김부식	Noech'ŏn	뇌천	雷川 金富軾	1075–1151
Yi Che-hyŏn	이제현	Ikjae	익재	益齋 李齊賢	1287–1367
Yi Saek	이색	Mogŭn	목은	牧隱 李穡	1328–1396
Chŏng Mong-ju	정몽주	P'oŭn	포은	圃隱 鄭夢周	1337–1392
Chŏng Tojŏn	정도전	Sambong	삼봉	三峰 鄭道傳	1342–1398

Joseon dynasty

Name	Hangul	Art name		Hanja	Dates
Ha Ryun	하륜	Hojŏng	호정	浩亭 河崙	1347–1416
Kil Chae	길재	Yaŭn	야은	冶隱 吉再	1353–1419
Kwŏn Kŭn	권근	Yangch'on	양촌	陽村 權近	1352–1409
Sin Sukchu	신숙주	Pohanjae	보한재	保閑齋 申叔舟	1417–1475
Kim Chong-jik	김종직	Chŏmp'ilchae	점필재	佔畢齋 金宗直	1431–1492
Kim Sisŭp	김시습	Maewŏltang	매월당	梅月堂 金時習	1435–1493
Nam Kon	남곤	Chijŏng	지정	止亭 南袞	1471–1527
Cho Kwangjo	조광조	Chŏngam	정암	靜庵 趙光祖	1482–1519
Sŏ Kyŏngdŏk	서경덕	Hwadam	화담	花潭 徐敬德	1489–1546
Yi Ŏnjŏk	이언적	Hoejae	회재	晦齋 李彦迪	1491–1553
Yi Hwang	이황	T'oegye	퇴계	退溪 李滉	1501–1570
Cho Sik	조식	Nammyŏng	남명	南冥 曺植	1501–1570
Yi Chŏng	이정	Kwiam	귀암	龜巖 李楨	1512–1571
Sŏng Hon	성혼	Ugye	우계	牛溪 成渾	1535–1598
Song Ikp'il	송익필	Kubong	구봉	龜峰 宋翼弼	1534–1599
Yi I	이이	Yulgok	율곡	栗谷 李耳	1536–1584
Chŏng Ku	정구	Hangang	한강	寒岡 鄭逑	1543–1620
Kim Jang-saeng	김장생	Sakye	사계	沙溪 金長生	1548–1631
Chang Hyŏn'gwang	장현광	Yŏhŏn	여헌	旅軒 張顯光	1554–1637
Chang Hŭnghyo	장홍효	Kyŏngdang		敬堂 張興孝	1564–1633
Kim Jip	김집	Shindokjae	신독재	愼獨齋 金集	1574–1656
Hŏ Mok	허목	Misu	미수	眉叟 許穆	1595–1682
Song Si-yŏl	송시열	Uam	우암	尤庵 宋時烈	1607–1689
Yi Gu	이구	Hwaljae	활재	活齋 李矩	1613–1654
Yun Hyu	윤휴	Paekho	백호	白湖 尹鑴	1617–1680
Yu Hyeong-won	유형원	Bangye	반계	磻溪 柳馨遠	1622–1673
Yun Jeung	윤증	Myongjae	명재	明齋 尹拯	1629–1714
Yi Sŏu	이서우	Songgok	송곡	松谷 李瑞雨	1633–1709
Kwon Sang-ha	권상하	Suam	수암	遂庵 權尙夏	1641–1721
Yi Ik	이익	Sŏngho	성호	星湖 李瀷	1681–1763
Hong Taeyong	홍대용	Tamhŏn	담헌	湛軒 洪大容	1731–1783
Pak Chiwŏn	박지원	Yŏnam	연암	燕岩 朴趾源	1737–1805
Chŏng Yagyong	정약용	Tasan	다산	茶山 丁若鏞	1762–1836
Pak Kyusu	박규수	Hwanjae	환재	桓齋 朴珪壽	1807–1877

Modern Korea

Name	Hangul	Art name	Hanja	Dates
Byung-Chul Han	한병철			1959-
Ham Seok-heon	함석헌			1901-1989
T. K. Seung	승계호			1930–2022
Kah Kyung Cho	조가경			1927-2022
Kim Hyung-suk	김형석			1920-
Kim Jaegwon	김재권			1934–2019
Park Ynhui	박이문			1930-2017
Song Du-yul	송두율			1944-
Do-ol	도올			1948-
Kim Hei-sook	김혜숙			1954-
Nam In Lee	이남인		李南麟	1958-
Sun-Joo Shin	신선주			
Byeong-uk Yi	이병욱			1959-
Byeong Deok Lee	이병덕		李秉德	1962-
Hasok Chang	장하석			1967-
Sukjae Lee	이석재			
Seahwa Kim	김세화		金世和	1968-
Sungho Choi	최성호		崔星豪	1972-
Hyundeuk Cheon	천현득		千玹得	1977-
Nikolaj Jang Lee Linding Pedersen	피더슨니콜라이장			1978-
Hun Chung	정훈		鄭勳	1980-
Junyeol Kim	김준열		金俊烈	1983-

== See also ==
- Korean philosophy
