= Ha Ryun =

Korean scholar-bureaucrat (1347–1416)

Chief State Councillor
- In office May 6, 1414 – June 13, 1415
- Preceded by: Sŏng Sŏngnin
- Succeeded by: Sŏng Sŏngnin
- In office November 17, 1409 – September 26, 1412
- Preceded by: Yi Sŏ
- Succeeded by: Sŏng Sŏngnin
- In office March 8, 1408 – September 18, 1409
- Preceded by: Yi Hwa, Grand Prince Uian
- Succeeded by: Yi Sŏ

Left State Councillor
- In office September 1412 – May 6, 1414
- Preceded by: Sŏng Sŏngnin
- Succeeded by: Nam Chae
- In office February 14, 1405 – August 6, 1407
- Preceded by: Cho Chun
- Succeeded by: Sŏng Sŏngnin
- In office October 30, 1402 – July 12, 1404
- Preceded by: Kim Sahyŏng
- Succeeded by: Cho Chun

Right State Councillor
- In office September 25, 1400 – April 14, 1401
- Preceded by: Min Che
- Succeeded by: Yi Sŏ

Personal details
- Born: January 22, 1348; Jinju, South Gyeongsang Province, Goryeo
- Died: November 24, 1416 (aged 68)

Korean name
- Hangul: 하륜
- Hanja: 河崙
- RR: Ha Ryun
- MR: Ha Ryun

Art name
- Hangul: 호정
- Hanja: 浩亭
- RR: Hojeong
- MR: Hojŏng

Courtesy name
- Hangul: 대림, 중림
- Hanja: 大臨, 仲臨
- RR: Daerim, Jungrim
- MR: Taerim, Chungnim

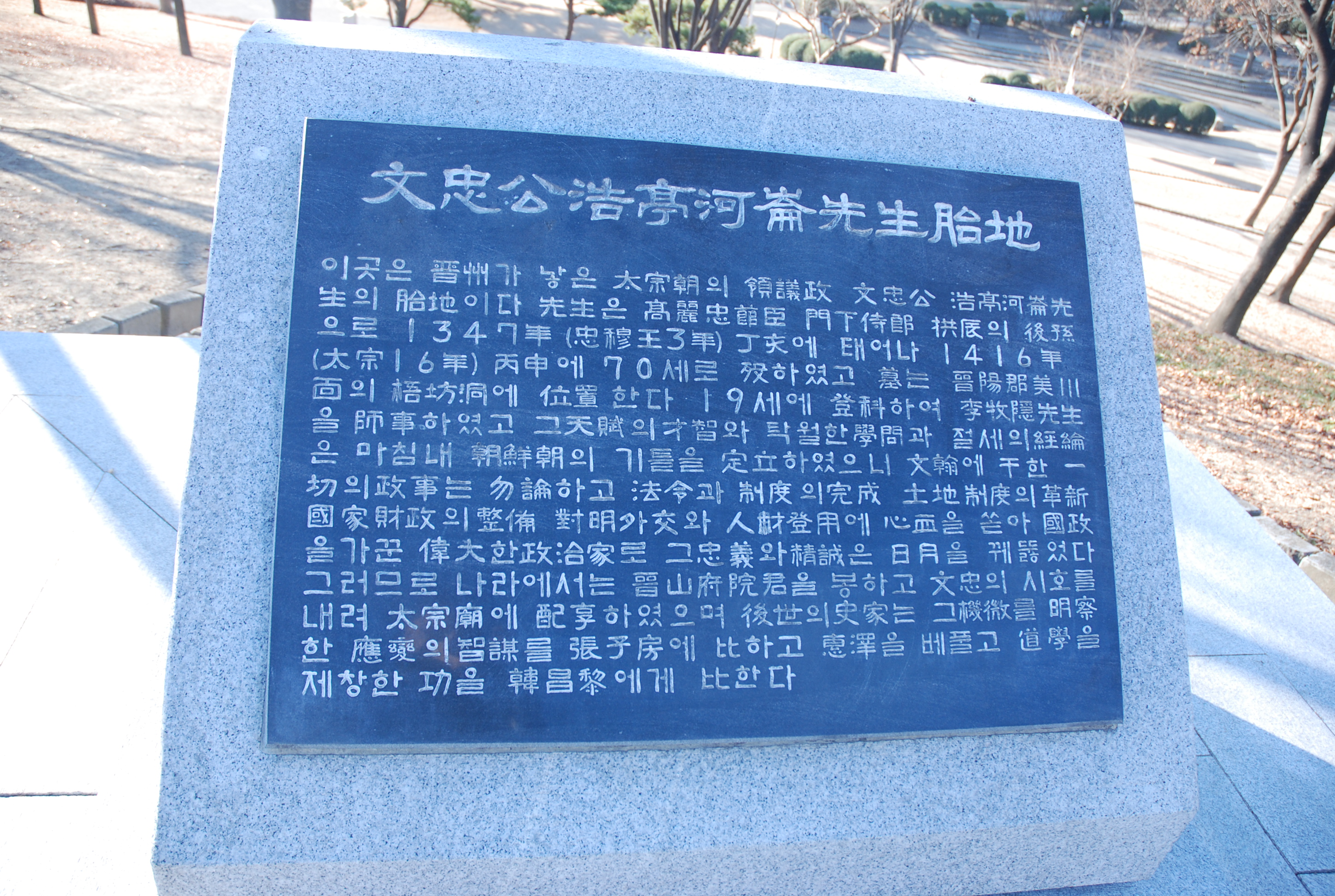
A commemoration plaque for Ha Ryun at Jinju Castle, where he was born

Ha Ryun (Korean: 하륜; Hanja: 河崙; January 22, 1348 – November 24, 1416), also spelled as Ha Yun (하윤), was a Joseon politician and Neo-Confucian scholar, educator, and writer. He served as Chief State Councillor during the reign of King Taejong from 1408 to 1409, from 1409 to 1412 and again from 1414 to 1415. He was from the Jinju Ha clan (진주 하씨; 晋州河氏). (Note: The clan was also known as the Jinyang Ha clan (진양 하씨; 晋陽 河氏))

He was exiled for his opposition to Ch'oe Yŏng's decision to attempt to conquer Liaodong (1388), and supported Yi Pangwŏn (later Taejong of Joseon) during the First Strife of Princes (1398).

== Family ==
- Father - Ha Yunrin (하윤린; 河允潾; ?–1394)
  - Grandfather - Ha Sawŏn (하시원; 河侍源; ?–1360)
  - Grandmother - Lady Chŏng of the Jinju Chŏng clan (증 정경부인 진주 정씨; 贈 貞敬夫人 晉州 鄭氏); daughter of Chŏng Kyun (정균; 鄭均)
- Mother - Princess Consort Jinhanguk of the Jinju Kang clan (증 진한국대부인 진주 강씨; 贈 辰韓國大夫人 晋州 姜氏; ?–1380)
  - Grandfather - Kang Sŭngyu (강승유; 姜承裕)
- Wife and children
  - Princess Consort Jinhanguk of the Seongju Yi clan (진한국대부인 성주 이씨; 辰韓國大夫人 星州 李氏); daughter of Yi In-mi (이인미; 李仁美)
    - Son - Ha Ku (하구; 河久; 1380–1417)
    - Daughter - Lady Ha of the Jinju Ha clan (진주 하씨; 晋州 河氏)
      - Son-in-law - Hong Sŏp (홍섭; 洪涉)
    - Daughter - Lady Ha of the Jinju Ha clan (진주 하씨; 晋州 河氏)
      - Son-in-law - Yi Sŭnggan (이승간; 李承幹; 1416–1417)

== Works ==
- Hojŏng chip (호정집 浩亭集)
- Samguk saryak (삼국사략 三國史略)
- Tongguk yakun (동국약운 東國略韻)
- Tongguk saryak (동국사략 東國史略)
- Toinsongdojigok (도인송도지곡 都人頌禱之曲)
- Sumyŏngmyŏng (수명명 受明命; 1402)
- Sŏngdŏkga (성덕가 聖德歌; 1402)

== Popular culture ==
- Portrayed by Shin Choong-sik in the 1983 MBC TV series The King of Chudong Palace.
- Portrayed by Im Hyuk in the 1996-98 KBS1 TV series Tears of the Dragon.
- Portrayed by Choi Jong-won in the 2008 KBS1 TV series The Great King, Sejong.
- Portrayed by Lee Kwang-ki in the 2014 KBS1 TV series Jeong Do-jeon.
- Portrayed by Jo Hee-bong in the 2015–2016 SBS TV series Six Flying Dragons.
- Portrayed by Nam Sung Jin in the 2021–2022 KBS1 TV series "The King of Tears, Lee Bang Won".

== See also ==
- Chŏng Tojŏn
- Chŏng Mong-ju
- Yi Saek
- Taejong of Joseon
- Yeonguijeong
