= Korean philosophy =

Korean philosophy (한국 철학) refers to the philosophical traditions that have developed on the Korean Peninsula. It is characterized by a practical orientation emphasizing self-cultivation, communal ethics, the integration of theory with everyday life, and social customs. Traditional Korean thought has been shaped by indigenous Korean shamanism, Korean Taoism, Korean Buddhism, Korean Confucianism (especially Neo-Confucianism), and the Silhak (Practical Learning) movement. From the late 19th and 20th centuries onward, Western philosophical currents have exerted strong influence on Korean academia, politics, and intellectual life, with divergent trajectories in North Korea and South Korea after 1945.

Philosophical inquiry in Korea has typically prioritized relational ontology, moral emotions, ancestral understanding, and the cultivation of character for the public good over purely speculative metaphysics in the traditional Western sense.

== Three Kingdoms of Korea, Northern and Southern States period, and Goryeo ==
=== Buddhism ===
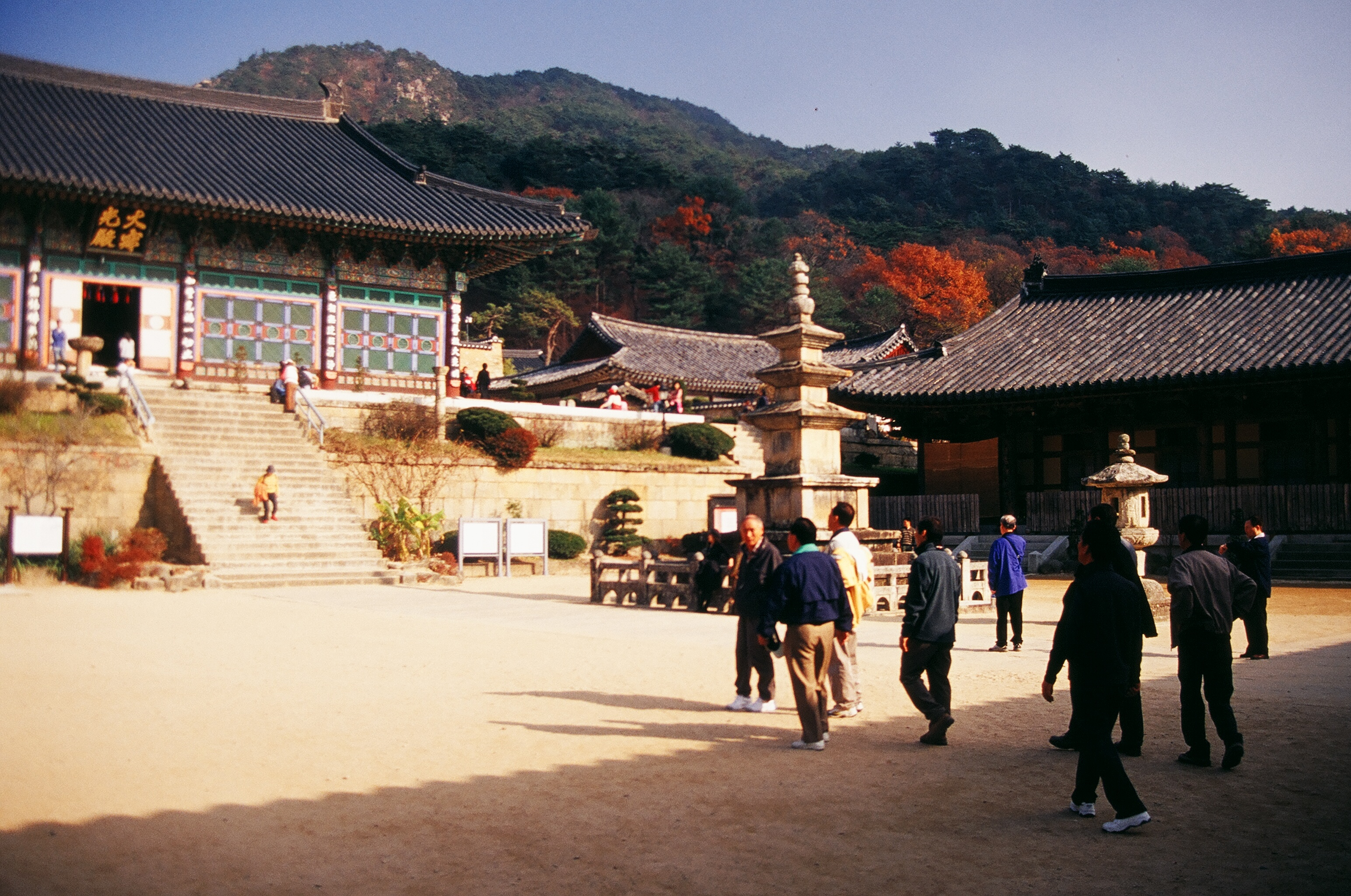
Haeinsa is a Buddhist temple in South Gyeongsang Province.

Korean Buddhist thinkers refined ideas originally introduced from China into a distinct form. The Three Kingdoms of Korea introduced Buddhism to Japan, from where it was popularized in the West. Today, Korean Buddhism consists mostly of the Seon lineage, which is derivative of the Chan (Zen) Buddhism of China and precursor to Zen Buddhism known in the West through Japan.

Buddhist temples can be found in most parts of Korea and many are considered national treasures.

=== Confucianism ===
One of the most substantial influences in Korean intellectual history was the introduction of Confucian thought as part of the cultural exchange from China. Today the legacy of Confucianism remains a fundamental part of Korean society, shaping the moral system, the way of life, social relations between old and young, and high culture, and even survived the modernization of the legal system.

== Joseon ==
=== Neo-Confucianism ===
This dynasty arose out of the military dictatorships and chaos of the preceding era. Transition in this era was from Buddhism to a soldierly approach to Neo-Confucianism. Much work was done, especially on commentaries, and the Chu Hsi school represented indeed the golden age of Korean religious philosophy. Metaphysical research at this time investigated the theological relations between principle (i) and material/vital force (ki), and between as well the four beginnings (sadan), and the seven feelings (ch'ilchong); with the division of the Joseon Confucianists into two leading schools: one on "force" and one on "principles". The philosopher Hwadam ( Suh Kyungduk, 1489–1546 ) moved to integrate i and ki and spoke of Great Harmony (taehwa).

In the Four–Seven Debate with Ki Daesung, Toegye ( Yi Hwang, 1501 – 70 ), while being still dualistic, broke away from Chu Hsi by espousing the reciprocal emanation (hobal) of i and ki: with the Four, ki follows i when i becomes emanant; with the Seven, when ki becomes emanant, i 'rides' ki. Though he was critical of Toegye's idea that ki follows i as being dualistic, Yulgok (Yi I, 1536 – 84 ) nevertheless embraced his notion that i 'rides' ki: only ki is emanant and i moves its emanation; i and ki are 'neither two things nor one thing', as evidenced by 'wondrous fusion' (myohap). For Yulgok, original nature (i) and physical nature (ki) coalesce into one human nature. Toegye and Yulgok, whose thoughts culminated in an irenic fusionism, constituted the crowning phase of East Asian neo-Confucianism by exhibiting dialectical dexterity in articulating the concepts of i and ki, left unclarified by the Chinese.

Toegye also developed the neo-Confucianist concept of single-mindedness (kyung), which was a manifestation of his unequivocal humanism, as shown by his total rejection of the Mandate of Heaven (chunmyung), which still had a hold on the Chinese, including Chu Hsi. Toegye's kyung synthesized the primeval Korean sense of supreme-efforts-come-earnest-devotion (chisung) with the Confucianist notion of holding fast to mind (jik-yung); he advocated self-efforts for creating a meaningful life. In particular, his concept of single-mindedness had a lasting influence on the Japanese neo-Confucianists of the Tokugawa period.

Every major Korean neo-Confucianist shared Toegye's preoccupation with single-mindedness, which signalled new stress on praxis in the development of Korean neo-Confucianism: the fusion of the metaphysical and the physical is better brought about through action than speculation, important as theory might be. That was the point of Yulgok's integration of sincerity (sung) with single-mindedness. In this respect Korean neo-Confucianism made a break with the Cheng-Chu school of Chinese neo-Confucianism, which was overly speculative.

=== Silhak ===
During the later Joseon period, Silhak, a form of Neo-Confucianism, emerged. One of the most prominent Silhak philosophers was Chŏng Yagyong.

== Korea in 1890–1945 ==
=== Western philosophy ===
Those who were sent to be educated in Japan, returned with limited knowledge of Western philosophy as a whole, although the German educational influence in Japan led to the beginning of interest in German idealists in Korea through indirect knowledge, with the exception of Marx, Hegel, and the dialecticians.

=== Christianity ===
The strong influence of low church Christianity, through missionary schools, led to practical American YMCA-style philosophy entering into Korea from the 1890s onwards. The discussion of Korean Christianity and Korean Christian philosophy is complicated with many divisions, and discussed in articles elsewhere.

== South Korea ==
=== Western philosophy ===
South Korea was mostly under the influence of the mixture of German idealism and Neo-confucianism from 1948 to early 1980s, when South Korea was ruled by authoritarian regime. After democratization in the late 1980s, philosophy in South Korea was divided by many Western schools. Marxism, Analytic philosophy, Post-Structuralism, Liberalism and Libertarianism has had great impacts on South Korean academia and society from the late 1980s onwards.

Greek philosophy and Medieval philosophy gain interests from academic philosophers and Christians. They have been studied in theological colleges and universities. As Korean Christian philosophy, Minjung theology could be mentioned, but it is not a mainstream theology in South Korean Christianity.

=== Eastern philosophy ===
Mostly, Hundred Schools of Thought, Neo-Confucianism and Taoism in East Asia and Buddhist philosophy have been studied by academic philosophers and Buddhists. General Indian philosophy and Japanese philosophy are limitedly studied. South Korean outside of academia tend to accept Eastern philosophy as a source of life lessons.

Korean shamanism and Donghak tend to be studied in the relation with Korean nationality.

== List of philosophers ==
=== Buddhist philosophers ===
- Seungnang (circa 6th century)
- Wonch'uk (613–696)
- Wonhyo (617–686)
- Uisang (625–702)
- Kyunyeo (923–973)
- Uicheon (1055–1101)
- Jinul (1158–1210)

=== Neo-Confucian philosophers ===
- Chŏng Mong-ju (1338–1392)
- Chŏng Tojŏn (1342–1398)
- Sŏ Kyŏngdŏk (1489–1546)
- Yi Ŏnjŏk (1491–1553)
- Cho Sik (1501–1572)
- Yi Hwang (1501–1570)
- Yi I (1536–1584)
- Chŏng Chedu (1649–1736)
- Chŏng Yagyong (1762–1836)
- Kim Chŏnghŭi (1786–1856)

=== Taoist philosophers ===
- Kim Sisŭp (1435–1493)
- Sŏ Kyŏngdŏk (1489–1546)
- Hŏ Kyun (1569–1618)
- Im Yunjidang (1721–1793)
- Jeon Byeong Hun (1857–1927)

=== Joseon period ===
These are listed by their most commonly used pen name, followed by their birth name.

- Sambong Chŏng Tojŏn (1337–1398)
- Yangch'on Kwŏn Kŭn (1352–1409)
- Maewŏltang Kim Sisŭp (1435–1493)
- Hwadam Sŏ Kyŏngdŏk (1489–1546)
- T'oegye Yi Hwang (1501–1570)
- Hasŏ Kim Inhu (1511–1560)
- Kobong Ki Taesŭng (1527–1572)
- Ugye Sŏng Hon (1535–1598)
- Yulgok Yi I (1536–1584)
- Yŏhŏn Chang Hyŏn'gwang (1554–1637)
- Uam Song Si-yŏl (1607–1689)
- Paekho Yun Hyu (1617–1680)
- Pan'gye Yu Hyeong-won (1622–1673)
- Udam Chŏng Sihan (1625–1707)
- Sŏgye Pak Sedang (1629–1703)
- Hagok Chŏng Chedu (1649–1736)
- Sŏngho Yi Ik (1681–1763)
- Namdang Han Wŏnjin (1682–1750)
- Tamhŏn Hong Taeyong (1731–1783)
- Yŏnam Pak Chiwŏn (1737–1805)
- Tasan Chŏng Yagyong (1762–1836)
- Hwasŏ Yi Hangno (1792–1868)
- Nosa Ki Chŏngjin (1798–1876)
- Hanju Yi Chinsang (1818–1885)

=== Contemporary Korean philosophers ===
- Jaegwon Kim (1934–2019)
- Do-ol Kim Yong-ok (1948–)
- Byung Chul-Han (1959–)
- Hasok Chang

== See also ==
- Silhak
- Seohak
- Tonghak
- Minjok
- Juche
- Songun
- Essence-Function (體用)
- Korean Taoism
- Korean Buddhism
- Korean Confucianism
- List of Korean philosophers
- Contemporary culture of South Korea
- Religion in Korea
- Seonbi
