= Jeong Do-jeon (TV series) =

2014 South Korean television series

- Genre: Period drama Political
- Written by: Jung Hyun-min
- Directed by: Kang Byung-taek; Lee Jae-hoon
- Starring: Cho Jae-hyun; Yoo Dong-geun; Seo In-seok; Park Yeong-gyu; Im Ho; Ahn Jae-mo
- Country of origin: South Korea
- Original language: Korean
- No. of episodes: 50

Production
- Executive producer: Kim Hyung-il
- Production location: South Korea
- Running time: Saturdays and Sundays at 21:40 (KST)
- Production company: KBS
- Budget: US$12.5 million

Original release
- Network: KBS1
- Release: January 4 – June 29, 2014

Jeong Do-jeon (Korean: 정도전) is a 2014 South Korean television series starring Cho Jae-hyun in the title role as Jeong Do-jeon, a real-life historical figure (1342–1398) who was one of the most powerful scholars and politicians of his time and a close supporter of King Taejo, the founder of the Joseon Dynasty. The period drama shows the crucial role Jeong had in the planning and founding of Joseon and the obstacles he faced in the process, as well as his lasting impact on Joseon's politics and laws. It aired on KBS1 from January 4 to June 29, 2014, on Saturdays and Sundays at 21:40 for 50 episodes.

Jeong Do-jeon received solid ratings and was hailed by critics as one of the most "authentic and realistic" Korean historical dramas in the new millennium. The series won the Grand Prize (Daesang), Best Director and Best Writer at the 41st Korea Broadcasting Awards, and Cho Jae-hyun won Best TV Actor at the 50th Baeksang Arts Awards.

== Plot ==
The drama begins in 1374, the final year of King Gongmin of Goryeo. Those times were marked by abuse of power, corruption and political chaos, as government officials and scholars dream of a new dynasty and a new era.

Jeong Do-jeon was an aristocrat and politician who assisted Yi Seong-gye (later King Taejo) when he seized power and established a new dynasty, Joseon. After Taejo became the first king of Joseon, he left all state affairs to Jeong, making him the most powerful and influential man who shaped the 500-year-long dynasty by laying down Joseon's ideological, institutional, and legal foundations. Deciding all policies from military affairs, diplomacy, and down to education, he laid down Joseon's political system and tax laws, replaced Buddhism with Confucianism as national religion, moved the capital from Kaesong to Hanyang (present-day Seoul), changed the kingdom's political system from feudalism to highly centralized bureaucracy, and wrote a code of laws that eventually became Joseon's constitution. He even decided the names of each palace, eight provinces, and districts in the capital. He also worked to free many slaves and reformed land policy.

Jeong died just six years after the foundation of Joseon, killed in 1398 by his political archenemy Yi Bang-won, Taejo's fifth son. Yi killed his two half-brothers (including the crown prince) as well as Jeong and his supporters in a coup that came to be known as the "First Strife of Princes", eventually becoming King Taejong, the third king of Joseon.

== Cast ==
=== Main characters ===
- Cho Jae-hyun as Jeong Do-jeon
  - Kang Yi-seok as young Jeong Do-jeon
- Yoo Dong-geun as Yi Seong-gye, later King Taejo
- Park Yeong-gyu as Yi In-im
- Seo In-seok as Choe Yeong
- Im Ho as Jeong Mong-ju
  - Won Duk-hyun as young Jeong Mong-ju
- Ahn Jae-mo as Yi Bang-won, later King Taejong

=== Supporting characters ===
==== People surrounding Jeong Do-jeon ====
- Lee Ah-hyun as Lady Choi, Jeong Do-jeon's wife
- Lee Choon-shik as Deuk-bo Ah-beom
- Im Dae-ho as Nam Eun
- Lee Byung-wook as Yoon So-jong
- Jeon Hyeon as Jo Joon
- Park Yoo-seung as Shim Hyo-saeng
- Kim Jung-min as Jung Jin
- Lee Doo-seok as Jung Young
- Yoo Jang-young as Jung Yoo

==== People surrounding Yi Seong-gye ====
- Lee Il-hwa as Lady Kang, later Queen Sindeok
- Sun Dong-hyuk as Yi Ji-ran
- Kang In-ki as Yi Bang-woo, later Prince Jinan
- Lee Tae-rim as Yi Bang-gwa, later King Jeongjong
- Kim Yoon-tae as Jo Young-gyu
- Song Yong-tae as Bae Geuk-ryeom
- Song Geum-sik as Byun An-ryeol
- Park Byung-ho as Muhak

==== Goryeo Conservative Party ====
- Jung Ho-keun as Im Kyun-mi
- Kim Min-sang as Uhm Heung-bang
- Bang Hyung-joo as Ji Yoon
- Kwon Tae-won as Ahn Sa-ki

==== Goryeo Royal House ====
- Kim Myung-soo as King Gongmin
- Lee Deok-hee as Queen Myeongdeok
- Lee Seung-min as Consort, Lady Jeong of Ahn clan
- Lee So-yoon as Consort, Lady Yik of Han clan
- Park Jin-woo as King Woo
  - Jung Yoon-seok as Monino, later King Woo
- Jeon Ye-seo as Lady Jang, Monino's nanny
- Seo Yi-an as Consort Geun of the Yi clan
- Kim Jin-tae as Kyung Bok-heung
- Lee Jung-sung as Choe Man-saeng
- Seo Woo-jin as Hong Ryun

==== Young Scholars/Intellectuals ====
- Park Ji-il as Yi Saek
- Kim Seung-wook as Park Sang-choong
- Lee Kwang-ki as Ha Ryun
- Kim Cheol-ki as Kwon Geun
- Jung Hee-tae as Yi Soong-in
- Shin Yong-gyu as Yi Cheom

==== People of Geopyeong Bugok ====
- Jang Tae-sung as Hwang Cheon-bok
- Lee Dae-ro as Hwang Yeon
- Kang Ye-sol as Yang Ji

== Production ==
Jeong Do-jeon was broadcaster KBS's response to mounting criticisms against historical dramas that have come to rely too much on fiction rather than facts. Korean TV critics called for the restoration of authentic period pieces, which had become increasingly rare since the beginning of the new millennium. Hoping that the drama can simultaneously entertain and retain historical integrity, Jang Seong-hwan, a KBS executive said during the press conference, "We have been eager to produce this project for a long time. As a public broadcaster, we felt that we had a duty to create dramas that promote a proper awareness of history."

The drama sets itself from others in the same genre by focusing on the life of a politician rather than the lives of monarchs. It underwent a two-year pre-production and had a budget of ₩13.5 billion (US$12.5 million). To create Jeong Do-jeon, the production team formed an advisory panel that consisted of history experts, all with doctorates or master's degrees in Korean history, concentrating on the era in which Jeong lived. The cast members also attended a four-month course taught by famed historian Lee Deok-il on Confucianism and the various government regulations that were created with the start of the Joseon era (while Goryeo's national religion was Buddhism, Joseon was built strictly upon Confucian values). The words quoted by Jeong Do-jeon, "If you capture the hearts of the people, the people obey you. But if you fail to win their hearts, they will indeed betray you," were in the production notes on the drama's website.

Head writer Jeong Hyeon-min in particular perused many books on the Goryeo times, as well as biographies of the figures in the drama. Jeong had previously worked for a decade as an aide to 10 Korean lawmakers from both the ruling Saenuri Party and the main opposition Democratic Party, and his ability to approach the drama's plot from a political spectrum was the reason executive producer Kim Hyeong-il hired him to write the TV series. Some cultural observers noted that the current political situation in Korea - with liberals and conservatives locked in power games - was quite similar to the setting of Jeong Do-jeon. Director Kang Byung-taek called Jeong "rational and practical. The two are important values in Korea today."

== Reception ==
Jeong Do-jeon received solid average ratings of 12 percent (according to AGB Nielsen Korea), and the drama's official website received 500 posts in its first two weeks. Unlike other Korean dramas, its primary viewer demographic are men over 40.

Another factor that has contributed to its success is the recent publication of books on Jeong's life. The history books led another broadcaster MBC to also plan a drama about the pivotal scholar. However, the success of KBS's program has caused MBC to postpone its plans indefinitely.

In addition, KBS worked to create synergy with its history talk show, The Day, History Journal, which runs at 10:30 p.m. on Sundays, right after Jeong Do-jeon finishes. Since the drama's first episode, the history talk show has dealt with Jeong, the fall of Goryeo and the rise of Joseon over three consecutive episodes. The history talk show invites not just historians as panel members, but also poets, film directors and pop culture critics.

== Awards and nominations ==
Year	Award	Category	Recipient	Result	Ref.
2014	50th Baeksang Arts Awards	Best Actor (TV)	Cho Jae-hyun	Won	
2014	41st Korea Broadcasting Prizes	Grand Prize (Daesang)	Jeong Do-jeon	Won	
2014	41st Korea Broadcasting Prizes	Best Director	Kang Byung-taek	Won	
2014	41st Korea Broadcasting Prizes	Best Screenplay	Jung Hyun-min	Won	
2014	7th Korea Drama Awards	Grand Prize (Daesang)	Cho Jae-hyun	Nominated	
2014	7th Korea Drama Awards	Best Drama	Jeong Do-jeon	Nominated	
2014	7th Korea Drama Awards	Best Screenplay	Jung Hyun-min	Won	
2014	3rd APAN Star Awards	Top Excellence Award, Actor in a Serial Drama	Cho Jae-hyun	Won	
2014	3rd APAN Star Awards	Excellence Award, Actor in a Serial Drama	Park Yeong-gyu	Nominated	
2014	KBS Drama Awards	Grand Prize (Daesang)	Yoo Dong-geun	Won	
2014	KBS Drama Awards	Top Excellence Award, Actor	Cho Jae-hyun	Won	
2014	KBS Drama Awards	Top Excellence Award, Actor	Yoo Dong-geun	Nominated	
2014	KBS Drama Awards	Excellence Award, Actor in a Serial Drama	Cho Jae-hyun	Nominated	
2014	KBS Drama Awards	Excellence Award, Actor in a Serial Drama	Yoo Dong-geun	Nominated	
2014	KBS Drama Awards	Excellence Award, Actor in a Serial Drama	Park Yeong-gyu	Won	
2014	KBS Drama Awards	Best Supporting Actor	Im Ho	Nominated	
2014	KBS Drama Awards	Best Young Actor	Jung Yoon-seok	Nominated	
2014	KBS Drama Awards	PD Award	Cho Jae-hyun	Nominated	
2014	KBS Drama Awards	Best Writer	Jung Hyun-min	Won	
2015	48th WorldFest-Houston International Film Festival	Platinum Remi for Dramatic TV Series	Jeong Do-jeon	Won	
