= Kil Chae =

Korean scholar-official (1353–1419)

- Born: 1353; Bonghan-ri, Goa-eup, Gumi, Gyeongsang Province, Goryeo
- Died: 1419 (aged 65–66)

Korean name
- Hangul: 길재
- Hanja: 吉再
- RR: Gil Jae
- MR: Kil Chae

Art name
- Hangul: 야은, 금오산인
- Hanja: 冶隱, 金烏山人
- RR: Yaeun, Geumosanin
- MR: Yaŭn, Kŭmosanin

Courtesy name
- Hangul: 재보
- Hanja: 再父
- RR: Jaebo
- MR: Chaebo

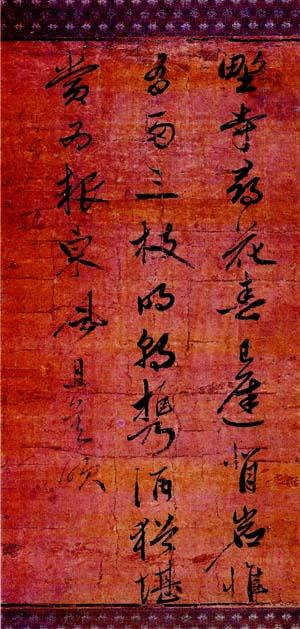
Letter of Kil Chae

Kil Chae (Korean: 길재; Hanja: 吉再; 1353–1419) was a Korean scholar-official who served near the end of Goryeo dynasty. A Goryeo loyalist, he refused to serve the new Joseon dynasty that overthrew Goryeo. The followers of Kil's teachings would coalesce as the Sarim faction.

== Works ==
- Yaeun jip (야은집; 冶隱集)
- Yaeun eunhaeng seupyu (야은언행습유; 冶隱言行拾遺)
- Yaeun sokjip (야은속집; 冶隱續集)

== See also ==
- Chŏng Mong-ju
- Chŏng To-jŏn
- Kwŏn Kŭn
- Chŏng Inji
