= Sambong chip =

Korean cultural heritage item, book & individual copy published in 1791

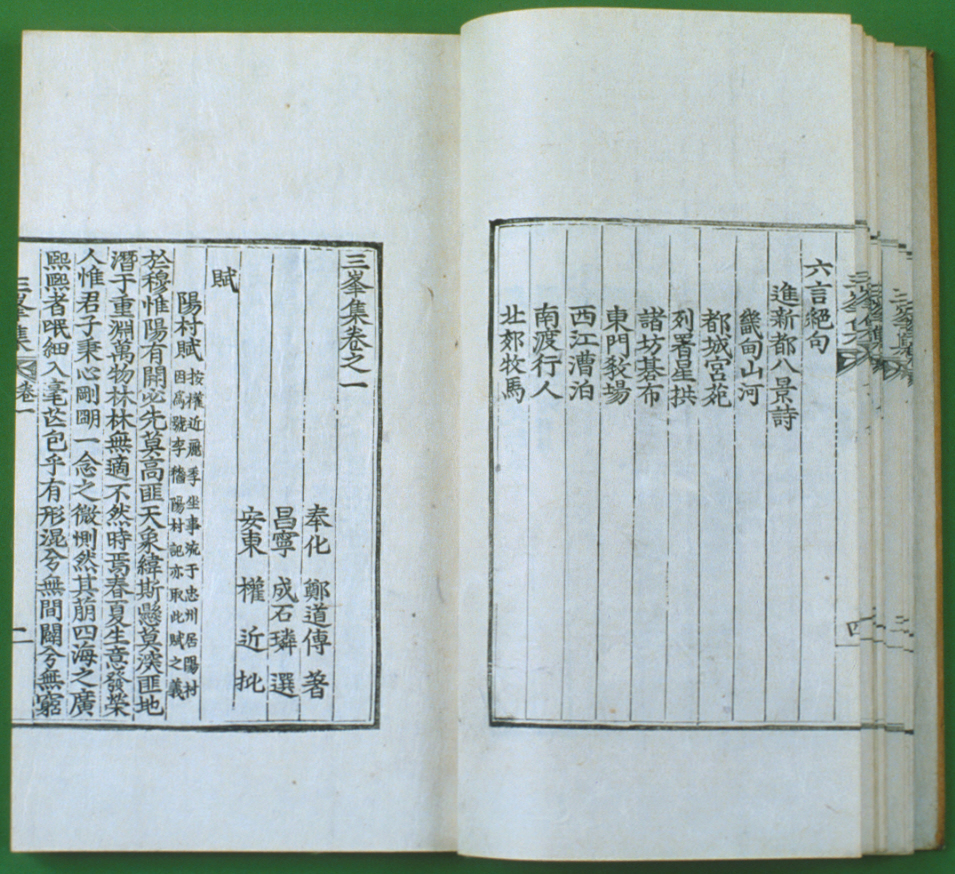
Page from the Sambong chip

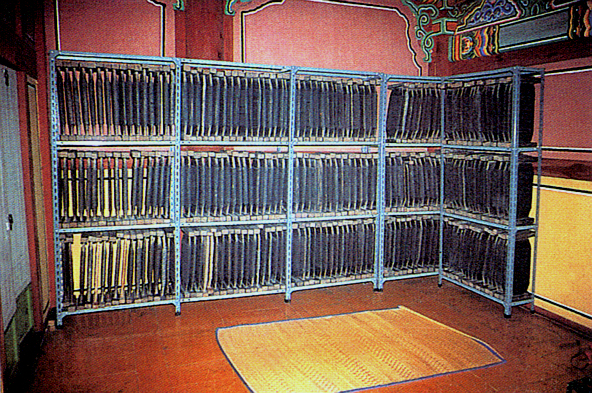
Sambong chip woodblocks

Sambong chip (삼봉집) is a collection of works by Chŏng Tojŏn, a key figure in the founding of Joseon and in the creation of Joseon's philosophy of government. It is a compilation of Chŏng Tojŏn (Sambong)'s poetry, prose, philosophy, and his plans for the reformation of the Goryeo /Joseon) government.

It was first published as two volumes by Chŏng Tojŏn's son, Chŏng Chin, in 1397. In 1465 it was republished and extended to six volumes by his great-grandson, Chŏng Munhyŏng, and later was further extended to eight volumes and republished under the same name in 1486.

The existing version of Sambong chip is that which was republished in 1791 by order of King Jeongjo, and includes writings omitted in the earlier versions, together with biographical information about Chŏng Tojŏn. This copy was designated a Treasure of the Republic of Korea (inventory number 1702 ) on 25 February 2011, while the woodblocks for this edition (held in the Bonghwa Chŏng clan's literature collection) were designated as Gyeonggi-do tangible cultural heritage item (no. 132) on May 7, 1986.

== Details ==
Volumes 1 to 4 contain poetry, and other miscellaneous writings.

Kyŏngje mun'gam (경제문감) is contained in volumes 5 and 6, and was first published in 1395 (under King Taejo). It describes the history and duties of China's officials who served as governors and leaders. It argues that a good government needs a legal system which strengthens the positions of the prime minister (and various other key officials) in order to achieve an effective centralized system.

Chosŏn Kyŏngguk chŏn (조선경국) is contained in volumes 7 and 8 was compiled in 1394, and modeled on Rites of Zhou (a Chinese Confucian text detailing the system of government under the Zhou dynasty) and outlines a proposed system of government. In the Ch'ijŏn (a subpart), the importance and role of the prime minister, and the appointment of officials via an examination system are examined, while the Pujŏn presents a plan to strengthen government by harmonising the national interest with the welfare of the people. The Chŏngjŏn discusses a system of national defense and concerns the military, the peasantry, together with punishment systems.

Volumes 9 and 10 contain An Array of Critiques of Buddhism (佛氏雜辨), Simgiri p'yŏn (心氣理篇), and Simmun ch'ŏndap (心問天答), and are writings criticising Taoism and Buddhism and arguing the philosophical superiority of Neo-Confucianism, together with the need for Buddhists' non-involvement in government. An Array of Critiques of Buddhism divides Buddhist doctrines into 10 parts, criticising each one by one and is considered to be the most comprehensive refutation of Buddhism among the criticisms of Buddhism by Confucian scholars in the late Goryeo and early Joseon Dynasties.

Volumes 11 and 12 contain the Collection of Economic Literature (경제문감별집) written in 1397 (under King Taejo'). This book describes the achievements of successive kings of China and Goryeo and supplements the shortcomings of Kyŏngje mun'gam (which dealt only with the duties of subjects) and discusses the nature of the rule of the monarch. Additionally, accomplishments of kings of Goryeo are recorded from the private accounts of Yi Che-hyŏn and other envoys, and are in the nature of historical records.

Volume 13 contains Chinbŏp (진법). Chŏng Tojŏn had been a military official, and had already written military books such as P'aljinsamsibyukbyŏndobo (팔진삼십육변도보, or Eight formations and thirty six changes ), Ohaengjinch'ulgido - Five Elements Avancement Guide (오행진출기도), and Kangmudo (강무도). However, Chinbŏp (진법) further develops these ideas and applies them to the proposed Liaodong conquest. The book refers to the Rites of Zhou and to the military techniques of China's famous generals, and explains in detail how to camp, how to command, and gives methods for attack and defense in warfare.

The appendix of volume 14 contains Sasil (Status (Facts) 사실), which is a collection of materials concerning Chŏng Tojŏn's life and career, and Chehyŏnsŏsul (제현서술), which is a collection of comments on Chŏng Tojŏn by later generations.

== Significance ==
Sambong chip is considered to be extraordinarilly valuable for the study of the founding ideology of Joseon. In particular, Chosŏn Kyŏngguk chŏn became the basis for the establishment of Kyŏngguk taejŏn, the legal code of the Joseon dynasty, and for the first legal code (promulgated in 1397) of the Joseon dynasty (Economic Battle, 경제육전 ).
