= Kang Yi-seok =

South Korean actor

- Born: November 11, 1998 (age 27); South Korea
- Education: School of Performing Arts Seoul
- Occupation: Actor
- Years active: 2006–present
- Agent: DIA Entertainment

Korean name
- Hangul: 강이석
- RR: Gang Iseok
- MR: Kang Isŏk

Kang Yi-seok (born November 11, 1998) is a South Korean actor. He began his career as a child actor, and has starred in television series such as Mr. Goodbye (2006), First Wives' Club (2007), Five Fingers (2012), and Ugly Alert (2013).

== Personal life ==
He joined the Navy on May 28, 2018, for his mandatory military enlistment and was discharged on March 8, 2020.

== Filmography ==
=== Film ===
Year	Title	Role
2006	Good Girl (short film)	
2006	Almost Love	
2006	Love Phobia	child cancer patient
2007	Someone Behind You	young Park Hyun-joong
2007	Our Town	young Hyo-yi
2007	Rainbow Eyes	young Cho Kyung-yoon
2008	Once Upon a Time in Seoul	Wonder child
2010	Bloody Innocent	11-year-old Seung-ho
2014	Mr. Perfect	Eun-seok

=== Television series ===
Year	Title	Role
2006	Mr. Goodbye	Yoon
2006	Lovers	Hee-dong
2006	Queen of the Game	Yeo-reum
2007	A Happy Woman	Se-jong
2007	Bad Couple	Kim Yi-chan
2007	First Wives' Club	Han Chul
2007	Auction House	Han-byeol
2007	Kimchi Cheese Smile	Myung-soo
2008	I Love You	Park Sang-jin
2008	Gourmet	young Lee Sung-chan
2008	Star's Lover	young Kim Chul-soo
2009	Cain and Abel	young Lee Cho-in
2009	Invincible Lee Pyung Kang	young Woo On-dal
2010	Running, Gu	young Gu Dae-gu
2010	Life Is Beautiful	Jae-chul and Soo-ja's son
2011	Dream High	young Jin-guk
2012	Love Again	Jung Yoo-joon
2012	Five Fingers	young Yoo Ji-ho
2012	Mom Is Acting Up	Wang Man-soo
2013	Hur Jun, The Original Story	young Heo Seok
2013	We Are Aliens	Kim Sung-jae
2013	Ugly Alert	young Gong Joon-soo
2013	The Suspicious Housekeeper	Jang-tae
2014	Jeong Do-jeon	young Jeong Do-jeon
2014	What Happens to My Family?	young Cha Dal-bong
2015	Late Night Restaurant	young Ryu
2017	Criminal Minds	young Kim Hyun-joon
2018	Mr. Sunshine	young Gojong
2022	Our Blues	young Bang Ho-sik

=== Web series ===
Year	Title	Role	Ref.
2021	Adult Trainee	Kim Sung-jae	
2022	Revenge of Others	Kwon Se-jin	

=== Television show ===
Year	Title	Role	Notes
2021	I Can See Your Voice 8	Contestant	episode 12
