= Chang Hŭnghyo =

Korean writer (1564–1633)

- Hangul: 장흥효
- Hanja: 張興孝
- RR: Jang Heunghyo
- MR: Chang Hŭnghyo

Art name
- Hangul: 경당
- Hanja: 敬堂
- RR: Gyeongdang
- MR: Kyŏngdang

Courtesy name
- Hangul: 행원
- Hanja: 行源
- RR: Haengwon
- MR: Haengwŏn

Chang Hŭnghyo (Korean: 장흥효; Hanja: 張興孝; 1564–1633) was one of the principal scholars of Neo-Confucianism in Korea in the early 17th century, active in the Gyeongbuk province. He was one of the main representatives of the second generation of scholars of the T'oegye school. His life and the development of his philosophy are well-documented thanks to his lifelong practice of keeping a diary.

== See also ==
- Chang Hyŏn'gwang
- List of Korean philosophers
