= Criticism of Buddhism =

Criticism of Buddhism has taken numerous different forms, including philosophical and rational criticisms, but also criticism of praxis, such as that its practitioners act in ways contrary to Buddhist principles or that those principles systemically marginalize women. There are many sources of criticism, both ancient and modern, stemming from other religions, the non-religious, and other Buddhists. Critiques can be philosophical, questioning doctrines such as impermanence, interdependence, emptiness and paranormal elements contained in the texts, or practical, focusing on instances where practitioners may have acted inconsistently with the religion's core ideals such as compassion, nonviolence (ahimsa), and the alleviation of suffering. Some Buddhist communities work to address historical inequalities and reinterpret teachings in ways that are socially inclusive and ethically consistent.

== Criticism of historical behavior ==
=== Buddhism and women ===
Women are often depicted in traditional Buddhist texts as deceitful and lustful. The Buddha is presented in a sixth century Chinese text (Note: The text is from the 转女身经 (The Sūtra on Transforming the Female Form) , one version in Chinese originally reads: "此身便為不淨之器，臭穢充滿，亦如枯井、空城、破村[...] 此身如廁，九孔流出種種不淨".) as saying that a woman's body is "a vessel of impurity, full of stinking filth. It is like a rotten pit ... like a toilet, with nine holes pouring all sorts of filth." Isaline Blew Horner and Diana Mary Paul are worried about the discrimination against almswomen and laywomen in Indian Buddhism. Kawahashi Noriko observes that the contemporary Buddhist community in Japan is rife with two views, one that women are inherently incompetent and the other that women need to be dependent on men for their liberation; and that the Japanese Buddhist community has consistently ignored women themselves, as well as feminist critique.

=== Buddhism and violence ===
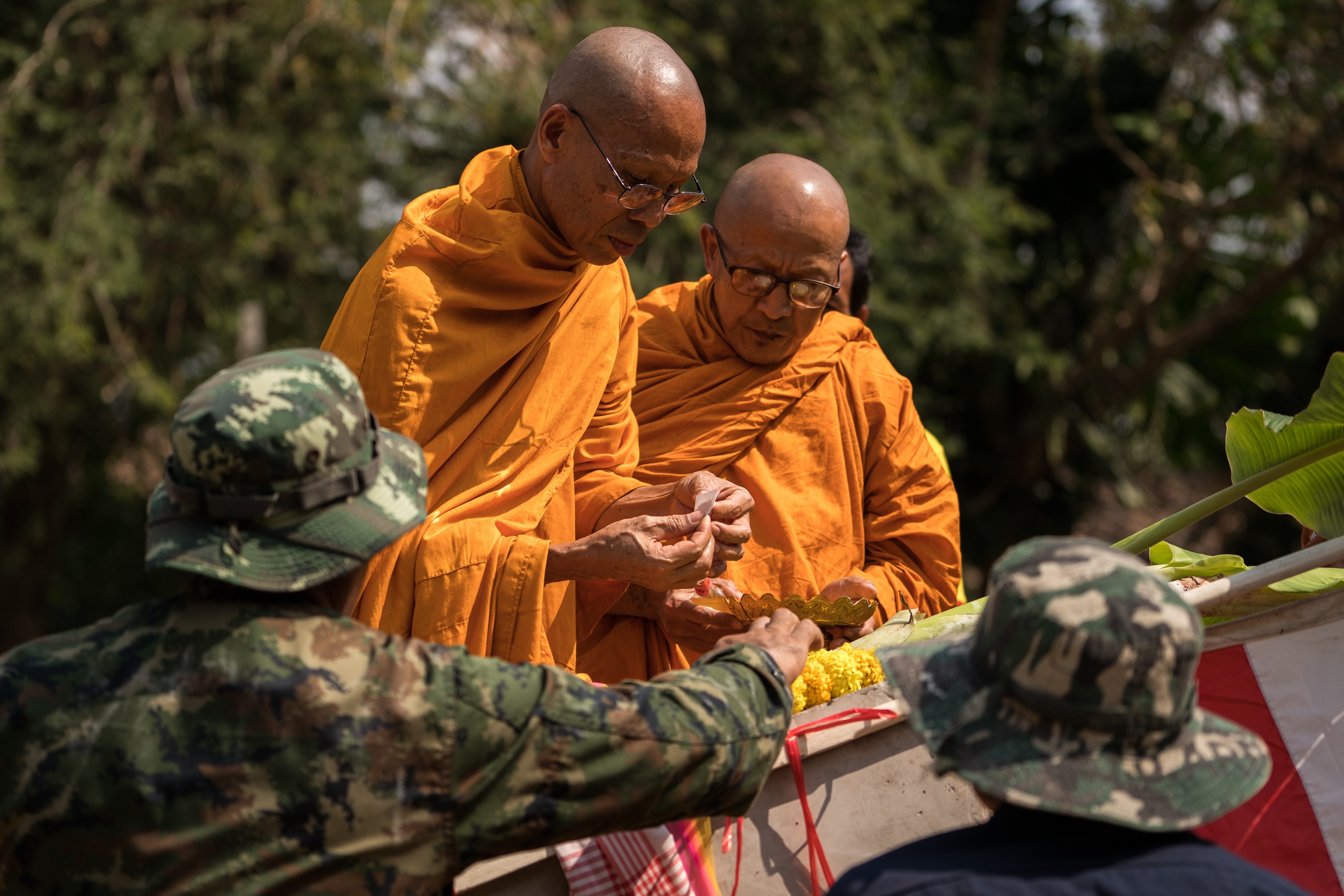
Thai Buddhist Monks blessing the primary pillar of a school presented by members of the Royal Thai Army during the Cobra Gold exercises

One of the five precepts for lay Buddhist practitioners is ahimsa, meaning to refrain from harming others. However, in different scriptures and commentaries, this precept is subject to various influences. Buddhism is often described as a pacifist religion due to its teachings advocating principles such as non-harming and non-violence, however, Buddhist scholar Michael Jerryson argues that instances of Buddhist violence demonstrate that the idea that Buddhism is 'wholly peaceful' is an 'ahistorical myth'.

Buddhists in Japan, Thailand, Myanmar and Sri Lanka have all faced criticism for their involvement in violence. During the Cold War era, the Thai monk Kittivuddho asserted in an interview that killing communists did not violate the principle of non-violence. In Sri Lanka, during the civil war, Sinhalese Buddhist nationalist monks served as chaplains providing religious services to Sinhalese Buddhist soldiers fighting Tamil Hindu insurgents. Monks who opposed this, such as Gananath Obeyesekere, Mahinda Deegalle and P. D. Premasiri, stated that violence is generally considered un-Buddhist and a distortion of the Buddha's teachings.

== Doctrine ==
=== Miracles ===
Buddhist texts contain a range of paranormal phenomena, such as the Buddha's mysterious origins, and some Buddhists claim that the Buddha himself levitated while meditating. Scottish philosopher David Hume, in An Enquiry Concerning Human Understanding, was skeptical of all religious miracles and advocated treating them in the same light.

Philosopher Sam Harris writes that while meditation and ethics found in Buddhism can be useful and even reveal truths about the world, it carries the same baggage as other religions with miracles, such as the birth of Guru Rinpoche, and religious violence, and thus the useful parts need to be separated from the term Buddhism.

=== Karma ===
Buddhist karma and karmic reincarnation are feared to potentially lead to fatalism and victim blaming. Paul Edwards says that karma does not provide a guide to action. Whitley Kaufman, in his 2014 book, cross-examines the idea that there is a taut relationship between karma and free will and that if karma existed, then evil would not exist because all victims of evil just get "deserved". Sallie B. King writes that karma often leads to stigmatization of people with disabilities and people of lower social status (e.g., Dalits in India), especially for people with disabilities, as the Buddha's own words in the Cūlakammavibhanga Sutta are used to justify the stigmatization.

Whitley Kaufman offers five criticisms of karma:

1. The Memory Problem: People have never found reliable evidence for the existence of reincarnation, and therefore, people have no way of knowing the specifics of the evils they have done in their past lives, and naturally, they cannot atone for them, which brings the whole theory closer to the theory of vengeance.
2. The Proportionality Problem: It is difficult to determine the evaluative relationship between a person's good and bad behavior.
3. The Infinite Regress Problem: Karma leads to the problem of infinite regression, where one cannot know where the first karma came from.
4. The Problem of Explaining Death: Since death is often viewed as the greatest evil in Buddhism, but everyone inevitably experiences death, this may weaken the rigor of the karma discourse.
5. The Free Will Problem: Karma's existence contradicts free will.

=== Hell and damnation ===
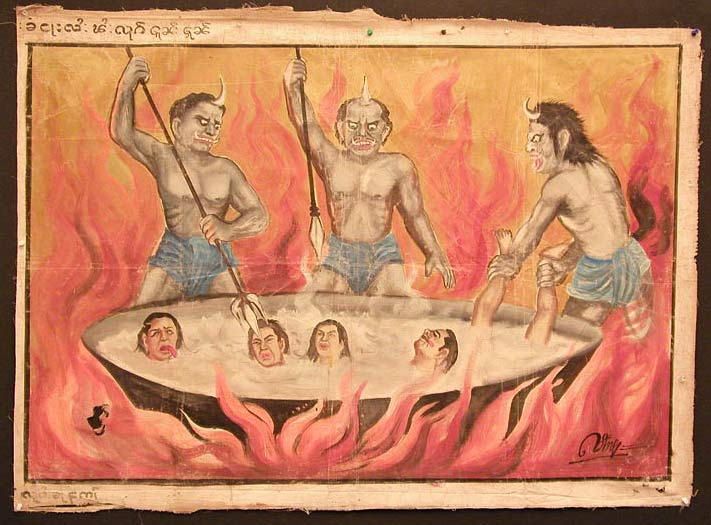
A depiction of Hell scenes in 19th-century Burmese temple paintings

It has been observed that monks threaten their audiences with the torments of Hell, linking salvation to regular offerings and verification.

In imperial China, bereaved families would pay monks to chant at their homes, offering alms to the monastic community in return. In Japan, Buddhists have faced criticism for their involvement in funeral rites and ancestral worship. Some deceased individuals receive posthumous Buddhist names, which exert a direct positive influence on their afterlife status. From very early times, posthumous Buddhist names were conferred based on merits accumulated during the deceased's lifetime at temples (such as donations or services rendered), alongside monetary contributions from surviving family members. However, due to the commodification of Buddhist names in Japan, this practice is facing increasing scrutiny. Inoue Shinichi of the Foundation for the Restoration of Buddhism has drawn parallels between Buddhist names sold for cash and Catholic indulgences. Hashimoto Eiju (橋本英樹), the head priest of Kenshō-in, and have fixed the price of offerings. On the other hand, Iwagami Chikō, board director of the Japan Buddhist Federation, has criticised fixing offering amounts as commercializing religion and as missing the point of offerings as an act of dāna, while acknowledging the need for better communication and training of priests.

==== Problem of Hell ====
Rui Han wrote that the concept of the problem of Hell does not apply to Buddhism, as Buddhism does not recognize an omnipotent, omniscient, and omnibenevolent god. In Buddhism, individuals fall into Hell due to the accumulation of karma, not divine punishment. Ethan Leong Yee and Luis Cordeiro-Rodrigues, however, argue that Rui Han's analysis contains contradictions. They take Rui Han's logic a step further, noting that while the existence of Hell seems to depend on the presence of beings with free will who are accountable for their actions, Buddhism holds that there is no real "self," which undermines the necessity of Hell's existence.

== Sectarianism in Buddhism ==
Buddhist scholars use terms such as "early Buddhism" to describe Buddhism before the early religious schisms. About a hundred years after the death of the Buddha, the Buddhist community began to conduct gatherings such as "councils" to resolve the divisions that existed at that time. However, a series of schisms still occurred, leading to the birth of many schools of Buddhism, and Buddhists sometimes use very pejorative terms to characterize other schools that do not share their beliefs. Adherents of Mahayana (and its derivative, Vajrayana) used the term Hinayana (small vehicle, lesser vehicle) pejoratively to refer to followers of Theravada.

== Criticism by other religions ==
=== Jainism ===
A Jain defense of its dualism of lifeless matter and everlasting soul, against the Charvaka denial of this existence, and what is described as the Buddhist notion of the impermanent or transient nature of the soul (consciousness), is articulated in Chapter 8 (verse 62–70) of Atmasiddhi Shastra, a 19th-century text by Shrimad Rajchandra. In this defense, living bodies are equated with dead bodies, to posit that matter (Pudgal) cannot produce consciousness. Jains often recognized Buddhism's radical "momentariness" as oversimplification of singular viewpoint Ṛjusūtra naya of its anekantvada system.

=== Taoism ===
Since the fall of the Han dynasty, Chinese Taoism and Buddhism have accused each other of copying their texts. Since at least 166, Taoism had propagated the idea that Laozi or one of his disciples went to India to become the Buddha to subdue the barbarians in the West. The Buddhists also fought back, and these debates continued until the middle of the 9th century.

=== Shinto ===
Hirata Atsutane, a Shinto fundamentalist and Japanese Kokugaku scholar, wrote a biography of the Buddha from a critical perspective. Atsutane's book was subsequently banned by the shogunate, but it was still widely disseminated among Japanese intellectuals and caused considerable embarrassment to the Buddhist community in Japan.

=== Hinduism ===
Hindu schools of philosophy, especially Vedanta, which puts great emphasis on the theories of atman and Brahman, have been critical of Buddhism due to its doctrines of sunyata and anatta, thereby labelling it as a nastika school of thought.

== See also ==
- Bulssi Japbyeon
- Index of Buddhism-related articles
- Secular Buddhism
- Post-canonical Buddhist texts
- Decline of the Dharma
- Buddhist eschatology
