= Jung Yoon-seok =

South Korean actor (born 2003)

- Born: April 30, 2003 (age 23); Seoul, South Korea
- Other name: Jung Yoon-suk
- Education: School of Performing Arts Seoul
- Occupation: Actor
- Years active: 2006–2022 (Note: indefinite hiatus)

Korean name
- Hangul: 정윤석
- RR: Jeong Yunseok
- MR: Chŏng Yunsŏk

Jung Yoon-seok (Korean: 정윤석; born April 30, 2003) is a South Korean actor. He won Best Young Actor award in 2009 SBS Drama Awards for his role in Temptation of Wife.

== Early life and education ==
Born to Korean–Chinese parents, Jung began his acting career in late 2006 at the age of three.

In 2019, Jung majored in acting at School of Performing Arts Seoul and graduated in 2022.

== Filmography ==
=== Film ===
Year	Title	Role	Notes	Ref.
2008	Little Prince	Han Eun-kyu		
2012	R2B: Return to Base	Park Woong		
2012	The Peach Tree	Sang-hyun (young)	supporting role	
2013	The Hero	Gyu-wan		
2013	Hwayi: A Monster Boy	Hwa-yi (10 year old)		
2014	Tazza: The Hidden Card	Ham Dae-gil (young)		
2014	Slow Video	Kim Baek-goo		
2015	Boyhood	Ji-hoon	short movie	
2016	The Jungle Book	Mowgli	Korean dubbing	
2016	Invitation (Note: It premiered at the 18th Seoul International Youth Film Festival in 2016.) (초대)	Dong-min	short movie	
2018	My Dream Class (별리섬)	Cha Sang-goo	short movie	

=== Television series ===
Year	Title	Role	Notes	Ref.
2006	Jumong	Yuri (young)		
2007	Snow in August	Na Da-bin		
2007	Lonely Bird	Ho-seok		
2007	The Legend	Ahjik (Gogeoryeon)		
2007–2008	The King and I	Yi Yung (young)		
2008
2008	New Heart	Kim Jung-min		
2008	East of Eden	Yo-seob		
2008	Amnok River Flows	Lee Mi-reuk (child)		
2008–2009	Temptation of Wife	Jung Ni-no		
2009	The Partner	Oh Jae-dong		
2009	Queen Seondeok	Kim Chun-chu (young)		
2009–2010	Three Brothers	Kim Jong-nam		
2010	The Miracle of Love	Kang Chul		
2010–2011	The King of Legend	Go Gu-bu (young)		
2011–2012	Bolder By the Day	Lee Yoon-seok		
2012	The King's Doctor	a child		
2012	Full House Take 2	Won Kang-hwi (young)		
2013	Dad Is a Mold Man (Note: This translation is NOT an official English title by EBS.) (아빠는 곰팡이맨)	Joon (준이)	ABU Children's Drama	
2013	Blooded Palace: The War of Flowers	Shunzhi Emperor		
2013	The Scandal	Ha Eun-joong (young)		
2013	Love in Her Bag	Eun Kyung-ho (young)		
2013	Good Doctor	Kyu-hyun		
2013	Master's Sun	Doll ghost	guest, episode 5–7	
2013	Drama Festival	Lee Joon-kyung (young)	episode: "Unrest"	
2013	Golden Rainbow	Kim Yeol-won (young)		
2014	Jeong Do-jeon	Monino (young)		
2014	I Need Romance 3	Joo Wan (young)		
2014	Jang Bo-ri Is Here!	Lee Jae-hwa (young)		
2014	Discovery of Love	Han Woo-joo		
2015	Danger Town (돌진! 슈퍼가정부와 위험한 동네)	Domuji	children's series	
2015	A Bird That Doesn't Sing	Oh Min-ki (young)		
2015	Yong-pal	Kim Tae-hyun (young)		
2015	My Daughter, Geum Sa-wol	Im Shi-ro (young)		
2015	KBS Drama Special	Soo-bong	episode: "Strange Fairy Tale"	
2016	Jang Yeong-sil	Jang Yeong-sil (young)		
2016	Six Flying Dragons	Lee Bang-seok		
2016	Five Enough	Yoon Woo-young		
2016	Flowers of the Prison	Yoon Tae-won (young)		
2016	Love in the Moonlight	Lee Yeong (young)		
2017	Lovers in Bloom	Kang Hae-chan		
2018	Grand Prince	Lee Myung after 10 years (Note: also known as adult Prince Seungpyung)		
2018	Folklore	Choi Dong-joo	episode: "Mongdal"	
2019	Flower Crew: Joseon Marriage Agency	Ma Joon		
2021	Bad and Crazy	Jung Yoon-ho (Note: later Shin Ju-hyeok)		

=== Web series ===
Year	Title	Role	Notes	Ref.
2019	My First First Love	Yoon Young-ho		
2020	Strange School Tales (학교기담)	Boo Young-seok	episode: "The Child Who Would Not Come" (오지 않는 아이)	

=== Television shows ===
Year	Title	Role	Notes	Ref.
2012	Mom the Wizard (엄마는 마법사)	Tamtam	Children's edutainment	

== Theater ==
=== Musical ===
Year	Title	Role	Venue	Ref.
2008	Chorus of Angels (천사들의 합창)	Unknown	New Millennium Hall, Sungkyunkwan University	

=== Play ===
Year	Title	Role	Notes	Venue	Ref.
2019	Now You C Me (나우유C미 (__씨에게))	Manager	segment: "A Defenseless Creature" (의지할 곳 없는 신세)	Art Hall, School of Performing Arts Seoul	
2019	Now You C Me (나우유C미 (__씨에게))	One of the men (Note: Korean: "사내" 役들 중 한 명)	segment: "I Would Like to See" (Note: literal title) (보고싶습니다)	Art Hall, School of Performing Arts Seoul	

== Ambassadorship ==
In 2013, Jung was appointed as the ambassador for the 13th Korea Youth Creation Film Festival (Korean: 제13회 대한민국 청소년 창작 영화제). From 2016 to 2018, he and Kim Ji-young were appointed as the ambassadors for Seoul Guro Kids International Film Festival (now Seoul International Children's Film Festival (SICFF)) 3 years in a row.

== Awards and nominations ==
Name of the award ceremony, year presented, category, nominee of the award, and the result of the nomination
Award ceremony	Year	Category	Nominee / Work	Result	Ref.
KBS Drama Awards	2013	Best Young Actor	Good Doctor	Nominated	
KBS Drama Awards	2014	Best Young Actor	Jeong Do-jeon	Nominated	
KBS Drama Awards	2016	Best Young Actor	Five Enough; Jang Yeong-sil; Love in the Moonlight	Won	
Korea Culture & Entertainment Awards	2015	Child Star Award	Jung Yoon-seok	Won	
Korea Youth Film Festival	2016	Most Popular Child Actor	Jung Yoon-seok	Won	
SBS Drama Awards	2009	Best Young Actor	Temptation of Wife	Won	
Seoul International Drama Awards	2021	Best Actor	Strange School Tales "The Child Who Would Not Come"	Nominated	
