= Six Flying Dragons =

2015–16 South Korean television series

- Promotional poster
- Also known as: Roots of the Throne
- Genre: Historical; Political drama; Action
- Written by: Kim Young-hyun; Park Sang-yeon
- Directed by: Shin Kyung-soo
- Starring: see cast
- Country of origin: South Korea
- Original language: Korean
- No. of episodes: 50

Production
- Executive producers: Han Jung-hwan; Lee Jae-won; Yoon Shin-ae
- Producers: Lee Hee-soo; Lee Young-joon
- Production locations: Samyang Ranch, Gangwon Province
- Running time: 60 minutes
- Production company: Redwoods
- Budget: ₩30 billion

Original release
- Network: SBS
- Release: October 5, 2015 – March 22, 2016

Related
- Deep Rooted Tree

Six Flying Dragons (Korean: 육룡이 나르샤; RR: Yungnyongi nareusya) is a South Korean television series starring Yoo Ah-in, Kim Myung-min, Shin Se-kyung, Byun Yo-han, Yoon Kyun-sang and Chun Ho-jin. It aired on SBS on Mondays and Tuesdays at 22:00 for 50 episodes beginning on October 5, 2015, as part of SBS 25th anniversary special. The drama serves as a loose prequel to Deep Rooted Tree.

== Title ==
The Korean title of the series is in Old Korean. Nareusya is a native Korean word, which translates to nara oreuda (날아 오르다) or "soar up to the sky" in modern Korean. Thus, the literal translation of the title is "six dragons soaring up to the sky" (여섯 마리의 용이 날아오르셔서).

== Plot ==
The story tells about the foundation of the Joseon dynasty in the Korean Peninsula, and the ambitions, success and conflicts of several real and fictional characters, with a focus on the young Yi Bang-won.

== Cast ==
=== The Six Dragons ===
- Yoo Ah-in as Yi Bang-won (later King Taejong)
  - Nam Da-reum as young Yi Bang-won
- Kim Myung-min as Sambong Jeong Do-jeon
- Shin Se-kyung as Boon-yi
  - Lee Re as young Boon-yi
  - Yoon Yoo-sun as old Boon-yi (cameo)
- Byun Yo-han as Yi Bang-ji, the best swordsman in the Three Kingdoms
  - Yoon Chan-young as young Ddang-sae
- Yoon Kyun-sang as Moo-hyul, the best swordsman in Joseon
  - Baek Seung-hwan as young Moo-hyul
- Chun Ho-jin as Yi Seong-gye (later King Taejo)

=== Supporting characters ===
==== People around Yi Bang-won ====
- Gong Seung-yeon as Min Da-kyung (later Queen Wongyeong), Yi Bang-won's wife
- Nam Da-reum as Yi Do (later King Sejong the Great), Yi Bang-won's third son
- Min Sung-wook as Jo Young-kyu, Yi Bang-won's bodyguard
- Jo Young-jin as Min Je, Yi Bang-won's father-in-law
- Cha Yong-hak as Yi Suk-beon
- Choi Dae-hoon as Sagok Jo Mal-saeng

==== People around Jeong Do-jeon ====
- Kim Eui-sung as Poeun Jeong Mong-ju
- Jin Seon-kyu as Nam Eun
- Lee Jeong-heon as Sim Hyo-saeng
- Yang Hyun-min as Yangchon Gwon Geun
- Gil Jung-woo as Jeong Gi-jun – son of Jeong Do-jeon's younger brother, Jeong Do-gwang

==== People around Boon-yi ====
- Jeon Mi-seon as Gannan/Yeon-hyang, Boon-yi's mother

==== People around Ddang-sae ====
- Jeong Yu-mi as Yeon-hee
  - Park Si-eun as young Yeon-hee
- Lee Cho-hee as Gap-boon
  - Kwak Ji-hye as young Gap-boon
- Seo Hyun-chul as Jang Sam-bong

==== People around Moo-hyul ====
- Seo Yi-sook as Myo-sang, Moo-hyul's grandmother
- Lee Jun-hyeok as Hong Dae-hong, Moo-hyul's martial arts teacher

==== People around Yi Seong-gye ====
- Lee Soon-jae as Yi Ja-chun, Yi Seong-gye's father (cameo)
- Kim Hee-jung as Madam Kang (later Queen Sindeok), Yi Seong-gye's second wife
- Seo Dong-won as Yi Bang-gwa (later King Jeongjong), Yi Seong-gye's second son
- Lee Seung-hyo as Yi Bang-u (later Grand Prince Jinan), Yi Seong-gye's first son
- Kang Shin-hyo as Yi Bang-gan (later Grand Prince Hoean), Yi Seong-gye's fourth son
  - Kim Sang-woo as young Yi Bang-gan
- Jung Jae-min as Yi Bang-ui (later Grand Prince Ik-an), Yi Seong-gye's third son
- Park Si-jin as Yi Bang-beon (later Grand Prince Muan), Yi Seong-gye's seventh son
  - Kim Ye-june as young Yi Bang-beon
- Jung Yoon-seok as Yi Bang-seok (later Crown Prince Uian), Yi Seong-gye's eighth son
  - Lee Seung-woo as young Yi Bang-seok
- Kim Ji-eun as Yi Bang-gan's wife

==== Joseon court officials ====
- Park Hae-soo as Yi Ji-ran, Yi Seong-gye's sworn brother
- Jo Hee-bong as Hojeong Ha Ryun
- Kwon Hwa-woon as Hwang Hŭi
- Lee Myeong-haeng as Jo Jun

==== Goryeo peoples ====
- Jeon Guk-hwan as Choe Yeong
- Lee Hyun-bae as King U
- Hwang Jae-won as King Chang
- Lee Do-yeop as King Gongyang
- Han Ye-ri as Yoon Rang/Cheok Sa-gwang
- Park Hoon as Cheok In-gwang, Cheok Sa-gwang's brother
- Yoon Seo-hyun as Woo Hak-joo
- Choi Jong-hwan as Jo Min-su
- Ahn Gil-kang as Jo So-saeng
- Choi Jong-won as Yi In-gyeom
- Jeon No-min as Hong In-bang
- Jung Doo-hong as Hong Ryun
- Jung Moon-sung as Han Gu-yeong
- Heo Joon-seok as Daegeun
- Park Hyuk-kwon as Gil Tae-mi/Gil Sun-mi
- Park Sung-hoon as Gil Yoo, Gil Tae-mi's son
- Kim Jong-soo as Yi Saek

==== Others ====
- Lee Ji-hoon as Heo Kang/Yi Shin-jeok
- Park Min-jung as Heuk-cheop Seon-hwa
- Yoon Son-ha as Cho-young
- Han Sang-jin as Monk Jukryong
- Kim Ha-kyun as Baek Yoon
- Yang Kyung-won as Ahn-won
- Ahn Suk-hwan as Teacher Yooksan
- Yeo Hoe-hyun as Sungkyunkwan student
- Jeon Sung-woo as Sungkyunkwan student
- Jeon Jin-seo as Eun-ho, King Gongyang's son

== Ratings ==
In the table below, the blue numbers represent the lowest ratings and the red numbers represent the highest ratings.

Episode #	Original broadcast date	Average audience share			
Episode #	Original broadcast date	TNmS Ratings		AGB Nielsen	
Episode #	Original broadcast date	Nationwide	Seoul National Capital Area	Nationwide	Seoul National Capital Area
1	October 5, 2015	10.6%	12.5%	12.3%	13.5%
2	October 6, 2015	10.3%	11.8%	12.4%	14.0%
3	October 12, 2015	10.8%	12.2%	11.6%	12.9%
4	October 13, 2015	11.2%	13.3%	13.0%	13.7%
5	October 19, 2015	11.2%	12.2%	13.7%	15.5%
6	October 20, 2015	12.8%	14.3%	15.4%	17.6%
7	October 26, 2015	9.5%	11.1%	12.5%	13.4%
8	October 27, 2015	11.9%	13.9%	14.1%	16.0%
9	November 2, 2015	10.8%	12.5%	13.5%	15.0%
10	November 3, 2015	11.0%	13.0%	13.5%	14.5%
11	November 9, 2015	10.0%	11.4%	13.3%	14.7%
12	November 10, 2015	11.3%	13.2%	14.1%	15.4%
13	November 17, 2015	9.6%	10.9%	12.2%	14.1%
14	November 17, 2015	9.9%	11.4%	13.2%	15.4%
15	November 23, 2015	10.7%	12.6%	14.6%	16.3%
16	November 24, 2015	10.1%	11.8%	12.6%	13.5%
17	November 30, 2015	10.1%	11.9%	14.1%	15.4%
18	December 1, 2015	10.2%	12.0%	13.6%	14.8%
19	December 7, 2015	10.4%	12.6%	13.3%	15.1%
20	December 8, 2015	9.9%	11.3%	13.4%	15.7%
21	December 14, 2015	10.5%	12.5%	13.3%	15.4%
22	December 15, 2015	9.9%	10.8%	13.9%	15.3%
23	December 21, 2015	10.0%	11.6%	13.1%	14.8%
24	December 22, 2015	10.0%	11.2%	13.7%	15.4%
25	December 28, 2015	10.2%	11.5%	13.4%	15.1%
26	December 29, 2015	10.5%	11.4%	13.8%	15.9%
2016
27	January 4, 2016	10.7%	12.5%	14.6%	16.6%
28	January 5, 2016	10.4%	11.6%	13.7%	15.8%
29	January 11, 2016	12.5%	14.3%	15.1%	16.8%
30	January 12, 2016	12.5%	14.5%	15.8%	17.4%
31	January 18, 2016	12.0%	14.0%	14.6%	16.5%
32	January 19, 2016	12.2%	13.4%	14.9%	16.6%
33	January 25, 2016	11.6%	13.6%	15.0%	17.2%
34	January 26, 2016	12.6%	13.4%	15.1%	17.3%
35	February 1, 2016	13.2%	15.1%	16.3%	18.5%
36	February 2, 2016	14.6%	17.3%	16.8%	19.3%
37	February 8, 2016	11.3%	12.9%	12.3%	13.3%
38	February 9, 2016	13.6%	16.7%	14.1%	15.3%
39	February 15, 2016	12.8%	14.7%	15.2%	16.9%
40	February 16, 2016	13.6%	15.3%	14.9%	16.6%
41	February 22, 2016	12.0%	13.6%	14.3%	15.9%
42	February 23, 2016	13.9%	15.2%	16.1%	18.9%
43	February 29, 2016	13.6%	15.0%	15.9%	18.0%
44	March 1, 2016	12.7%	13.5%	16.4%	18.3%
45	March 7, 2016	13.1%	14.6%	16.1%	17.9%
46	March 8, 2016	13.2%	14.7%	16.1%	17.4%
47	March 14, 2016	14.3%	16.6%	16.7%	17.9%
48	March 15, 2016	13.8%	15.7%	16.2%	17.9%
49	March 21, 2016	13.7%	15.9%	16.2%	17.9%
50	March 22, 2016	13.9%	16.4%	17.3%	18.8%
Average		11.6%	13.3%	14.3%	16.0%

== Awards and nominations ==
Year	Award	Category	Recipient	Result
2015	23rd SBS Drama Awards	Grand Prize (Daesang)	Yoo Ah-in	Nominated
2015	23rd SBS Drama Awards	Top Excellence Award, Actor in a Serial Drama	Yoo Ah-in	Won
2015	23rd SBS Drama Awards	Top Excellence Award, Actor in a Serial Drama	Kim Myung-min	Nominated
2015	23rd SBS Drama Awards	Top Excellence Award, Actor in a Serial Drama	Chun Ho-jin	Nominated
2015	23rd SBS Drama Awards	Top Excellence Award, Actress in a Serial Drama	Yoon Son-ha	Nominated
2015	23rd SBS Drama Awards	Excellence Award, Actor in a Serial Drama	Byun Yo-han	Won
2015	23rd SBS Drama Awards	Excellence Award, Actor in a Serial Drama	Choi Jong-won	Nominated
2015	23rd SBS Drama Awards	Excellence Award, Actress in a Serial Drama	Shin Se-kyung	Won
2015	23rd SBS Drama Awards	Special Award, Actor in a Serial Drama	Park Hyuk-kwon	Won
2015	23rd SBS Drama Awards	Special Award, Actor in a Serial Drama	Jeon No-min	Nominated
2015	23rd SBS Drama Awards	Special Award, Actress in a Serial Drama	Jeong Yu-mi	Nominated
2015	23rd SBS Drama Awards	Top 10 Stars	Yoo Ah-in	Won
2015	23rd SBS Drama Awards	Top 10 Stars	Shin Se-kyung	Won
2015	23rd SBS Drama Awards	Best Couple Award	Yoo Ah-in and Shin Se-kyung	Won
2015	23rd SBS Drama Awards	Producer's Award	Yoo Ah-in	Nominated
2015	23rd SBS Drama Awards	New Star Award	Gong Seung-yeon	Won
2015	23rd SBS Drama Awards	New Star Award	Byun Yo-han	Won
2015	23rd SBS Drama Awards	New Star Award	Yoon Kyun-sang	Won
2016	52nd Baeksang Arts Awards	Best Drama	Six Flying Dragons	Nominated
2016	52nd Baeksang Arts Awards	Best Director	Shin Kyung-soo	Nominated
2016	52nd Baeksang Arts Awards	Best Actor	Yoo Ah-in	Won
2016	52nd Baeksang Arts Awards	Best New Actor	Byun Yo-han	Nominated
2016	52nd Baeksang Arts Awards	Best Screenplay	Kim Young-hyun, Park Sang-yeon	Nominated
2016	43rd Korean Broadcasting Grand Prize Awards	Best Feature-Length Drama	Six Flying Dragons	Won
2016	11th Seoul International Drama Awards	Best Series Drama	Six Flying Dragons	Won
2016	11th Seoul International Drama Awards	Best Actor	Yoo Ah-in	Nominated
2016	5th APAN Star Awards	Top Excellence Award, Actor in a Serial Drama	Kim Myung-min	Nominated
2016	5th APAN Star Awards	Top Excellence Award, Actress in a Serial Drama	Shin Se-kyung	Nominated
2016	5th APAN Star Awards	Excellence Award, Actress in a Serial Drama	Jeong Yu-mi	Won
2016	9th Korea Drama Awards	Best Drama	Six Flying Dragons	Nominated
2016	9th Korea Drama Awards	Best Production Director	Shin Kyung-soo	Nominated
2016	1st Asia Artist Awards	Grand Prize (Daesang)	Yoo Ah-in	Nominated
2016	23rd Grimae Awards	Best New Actor	Yoon Kyun-sang	Won
2016	9th Tokyo Drama Awards	Best Foreign Drama	Six Flying Dragons	Won
2017	5th Annual DramaFever Awards	Best Actor	Yoo Ah-in	Nominated
