= Kwŏn Kŭn =

Korean Neo-Confucian scholar (1352–1409)

- Hangul: 권근
- Hanja: 權近
- RR: Gwon Geun
- MR: Kwŏn Kŭn

Art name
- Hangul: 양촌
- Hanja: 陽村
- RR: Yangchon
- MR: Yangch'on

Courtesy name
- Hangul: 가원, 사숙
- Hanja: 可遠, 思叔
- RR: Gawon, Sasuk
- MR: Kawŏn, Sasuk

Posthumous name
- Hangul: 문충
- Hanja: 文忠
- RR: Munchung
- MR: Munch'ung

Kwŏn Kŭn (1352 – 14 February 1409) was a Korean Neo-Confucian scholar at the dawn of the Joseon period, and a student of Yi Saek. He was one of the first Neo-Confucian scholars of the Joseon dynasty, and had a lasting influence on the rise of Neo-Confucianism in Korea.

== Biography ==
Kwŏn Kŭn was a Korean Neo-Confucian scholar at the time of the change from the Goryeo dynasty (during which Buddhism was a prominent philosophy) to Joseon. He was a member of the Andong Kwŏn clan that was very influential in the Goryeo court. He was a student of Yi Saek, and passed the civil service examinations at the age of eighteen.

Kwŏn Kŭn initially supported his mentor's resistance against the reforms led by Yi Sŏng-gye, Chŏng To-jŏn, and others, arguing that they could not hastily amend the laws of the previous kings. In 1389, during an envoy mission to the Ming dynasty, he discovered in advance that a Ming diplomatic document recognized King U as the son of Sin Ton, thereby denying the legitimacy of King Chang, and alerted the king, asking to take countermeasures. Furthermore, when Goryeo loyalist minister Yi Sung-in (1349–1392) was impeached by Yi Sŏng-gye's forces, Kwŏn submitted a petition in his defense, thus becoming a target of the revolutionaries and being exiled in October 1389.

During his one-year exile he got involved in the faction's attempt to prevent the rise of Yi Sŏng-gye, by alerting the Ming dynasty. He was acquitted when a flood that stopped the trial was accepted as an omen. When he returned from his exile, Kwŏn retired to the village of Yangchon, on which he based his pen name. However, in 1393 king Taejo (r. 1392–1398) convinced him to devote his talent for the new dynasty.

When a diplomatic dispute with the Ming dynasty arose in the fifth year of king Taejo's reign, Kwŏn Kŭn volunteered to travel to China to resolve the issue, coming into conflict with Chŏng To-jŏn's insistence on mobilizing the military and waging war; thus, Kwŏn's role was kept minimal, but Chŏng To-jŏn and many of his colleagues were wiped out during the succession struggle of 1398. From that point until his death, Kwŏn Kŭn became the most important scholar in the government. During this time Kwŏn Kŭn directed the education system back toward literary accomplishments. He utilized his scholarly abilities to theoretically support the stability of royal authority, and normalized the strained relationship between Joseon and Ming through his diplomatic missions to the Ming dynasty.

He is buried with his son Kwŏn Che and his grandson Kwŏn Ram.

== Importance ==
Kwŏn Kŭn lived and served during the dynastic change, and became eventually one of the architects of the Neo-Confucian ideology that provided both reasoning for the change, and ideological framework for the Joseon literati. He introduced Zhu Xi to the Korean audience, and his writings served as the basis for future scholars. He oversaw the nation's academic policies in the early Joseon, established various systems for education and talent selection, and is widely known as a scholar who significantly advanced the academic standards of the late Goryeo and early Joseon periods by writing numerous works on Neo-Confucianism and Confucian classics.

Among his writing on Neo-Confucianism, one of the most influential is the Iphak toseol (Diagrammatic Treatise for Entering Upon Learning). He created this book for some students who came with questions in 1390 while he was in exile. He also wrote five commentaries to the Five Classics, collectively known as Ogyeong cheongyeonnok (Short Commentaries on the Five Classics), starting in 1391 and finishing 14 years later. Kwŏn Kŭn developed a theory of ritual and emphasized the role of ritual in social order. He rearranged the Classic of Music, taking the first part as the original and the second part as a commentary.

Kwŏn Kŭn was a prolific writer, and he is also known for his contributions to several anti-Buddhist texts, including his preface to Chŏng To-jŏn's Pulssi Chappyŏn (An Array of Critiques of Buddhism), as well as a contribution to the standardization of the sacrifices to pacify restless spirits.

== Family ==
- Grandfather
  - Kwŏn Ko (권고; 權皐)
- Father
  - Kwŏn Hŭi (권희; 權僖; 1319–1405)
- Mother
  - Lady Han of the Hanyang Han clan (한양 한씨; 漢陽 韓氏; 1315–1398)
- Wife and children
  - Princess Sukgyŏng, Lady Yi of the Gyeongju Yi clan (숙경택주 경주 이씨; 淑敬宅主 慶州 李氏; 1367–1423); daughter of Yi Chon-o (이존오; 李存吾; 1341–1371)
    - Son - Kwŏn Che (1387–1445)
      - Daughter-in-law - Lady Yi of the Gyeongju Yi clan (경주 이씨; 慶州李氏; 1385–1468); daughter of Yi Hyu (이휴; 李携)
    - Son - Kwŏn Kyu (권규; 權跬; 1393–1421)
      - Daughter-in-law - Princess Gyŏng-an (경안공주; 1393 – 22 April 1415)
    - Daughter - Lady Kwŏn
      - Son-in-law - Yi Chong-sŏn (이종선)
    - Daughter - Lady Kwŏn
      - Son-in-law - Sŏ Mi-sŏng (서미성)

== Works ==
- Iphak doseol (Diagrams and Explanations upon Entering Learning; 입학도설; 入學圖說)
- Ogyeong cheongyeonnok (Short Commentaries on the Five Classics; 오경천견록; 五經淺見錄)
- Saseo ogyeong gugyeol (Mnemonics for the Four Book and the Five Classics; 사서오경구결; 四書五經口訣)
- Gwonhaksaui paljo (Eight Articles on Recommendations for Learning; 권학사의팔조; 勸學事宜八條)
- Dongguk ssaryak (Concise History of the Eastern State; 동국사략; 東國史略)
- Daeganjik imsamok (Admonition to the Appointment of Officials; 대간직임사목; 臺諫職任事目)
- Sangdae byeolgok (상대별곡; 霜臺別曲)
- Yangchonjip (Collected Works of Yangchon; 양촌집; 陽村集)

== Popular culture ==
- Portrayed by Lee Jung-woon in the 1996 KBS1 TV series Tears of the Dragon.
- Portrayed by Kim Cheol-ki in the 2014 KBS1 TV series Jeong Do-jeon.
- Portrayed by Yang Hyun-min in the 2015 SBS TV series Six Flying Dragons.
- Portrayed by Kim Young-gi in the 2021 KBS1 TV series The King of Tears, Lee Bang-won.

== See also ==
- List of Korean philosophers

== Bibliography ==
- Ralston, Michael Keith (2009). Ideas of self and self-cultivation in Korean Neo-Confucianism (Doctor of Philosophy (PhD) thesis). University of British Columbia. doi:10.14288/1.0090632.
- Kalton, Michael C. (1985). "The Writings of Kwon Kun: The Context and Shape of Early Yi Dynasty Neo-Confucianism". In de Bary, William Theodore; Kim Haboush, JaHyun (eds.). The Rise of Neo-Confucianism in Korea. Columbia University Press. ISBN 978-0231060523.
- Kalton, Michael C. (1987). "Early Yi Dynasty Neo-Confucianism: An Integrated Vision". In Kendall, Laurel; Dix, Griffin (eds.). Religion and Ritual in Korean Society. Institute of East Asian Studies, University of California. ISBN 978-0912966915.
