= Bulssi Japbyeon =

- Hangul: 불씨잡변
- Hanja: 佛氏雜辨
- RR: Bulssi japbyeon
- MR: Pulssi chappyŏn

The Bulssi Japbyeon, also known in English as An Array of Critiques of Buddhism, is a 1398 Korean Neo-Confucian polemical critique of Buddhism by Chŏng To-jŏn. In this work he carried out his most comprehensive refutation of Buddhism, singling out Buddhist doctrines and practices for detailed criticism.

Chŏng stated that this book was written with the objective of refuting Buddhism once and for all "lest it destroy morality and eventually humanity itself." The charges leveled against Buddhism in the Bulssi japbyeon constitute a full inventory of the various arguments made by Confucians and Neo-Confucians from the time of the introduction of Buddhism into East Asia during the 2nd century CE. These arguments are arranged in eighteen sections, each of which criticises a particular aspect of Buddhist doctrine or practice.

== See also ==
- Korean Confucianism
- Korean philosophy
- Religions of Korea
