= Yi Saek =

Korean writer (1328–1396)

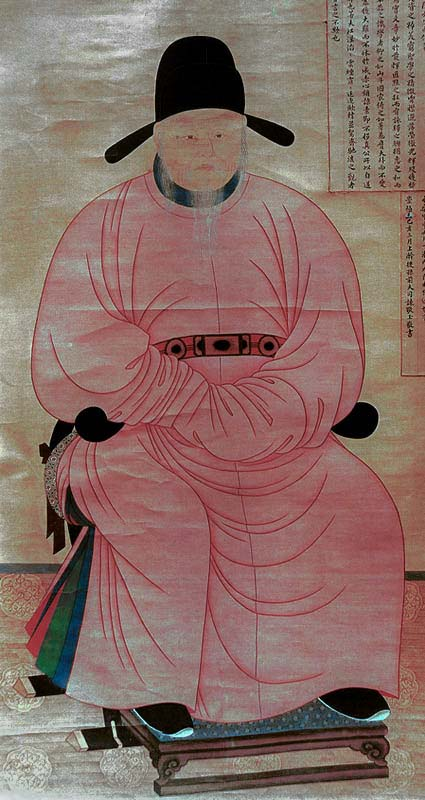
- Born: June 17, 1328
- Died: June 17, 1396 (aged 68)
- Occupation: Scholar-official

Korean name
- Hangul: 이색
- Hanja: 李穡
- RR: I Saek
- MR: I Saek

Art name
- Hangul: 목은
- Hanja: 牧隱
- RR: Mokeun
- MR: Mogŭn

Courtesy name
- Hangul: 영숙
- Hanja: 穎叔
- RR: Yeongsuk
- MR: Yŏngsuk

Yi Saek (Korean: 이색; Hanja: 李穡, June 17, 1328 – June 17, 1396 (Note: In Lunar Calendar, Yi was born on the 20th day of the fifth month of 1328 and died on 20th day of the fifth month of 1396)), also known by his art name Mogŭn (목은), was a Korean writer and poet. His family belonged to the Hansan Yi clan. Yi Saek played a crucial role in the introduction and localisation of philosophy of Zhu Xi. He studied Neo-Confucianism in Yuan Dynasty China and opened an academy after his return to Goryeo, and from his academy the founders of Joseon Dynasty were educated.

Yi was one of the most significant cultural figures in the country. Aiming to solve the social problems facing Goryeo, Yi fulfilled his responsibilities as a scholar, educator and politician based on his experience studying at Guozijian, a national Chinese university. While leading Sungkyunkwan academy, Yi developed a curriculum that reformed the academy's evaluation methods, which was innovative even by today's standards. Yi Saek played a very important role in introducing Neo-Confucianism to Goryeo, which was the theoretical background for the founding of Joseon.

Yi Saek was patronized by kings during the Koryo period (918–1392). He promoted education based on Confucian texts. Yi Saek is also responsible for establishing the Confucian tradition of public mourning. He favored Confucianism in public affairs. Towards the end of his life, Yi Saek was the respected head of the Confucian National Academy. He is remembered as one of the "Three Hermit Scholars" devoted to Confucian principles.

Many of his disciples, such as Chŏng To-jŏn and Kwŏn Kŭn, used Neo-Confucianism as the ideological basis for overthrowing the Buddhist kingdom of Goryeo and establishing Confucian Joseon. However, Yi Saek himself remained loyal to the Goryeo Dynasty and didn't believe the wiping out of Buddhism, as Chŏng To-jŏn insisted, would be of any benefit. Yi Saek believed in the co-existence of the "Three Disciplines": Confucianism, Buddhism and Taoism. Yi Saek resigned from all political positions after the founding of the Joseon Dynasty.

Yi Saek left various poetry, essays and letters compiled in The Collected Works of Mogŭn.

== Family ==
- Father
  - Yi Kok (이곡; 李穀; 25 August 1298 – 28 January 1351)
- Mother
  - Lady Kim of the Hamchang Kim clan (함창 김씨; 咸昌金氏)
- Sibling(s)
  - Older sister – Lady Yi of the Hansan Yi clan (한산 이씨; 韓山 李氏)
  - Younger sister – Lady Yi of the Hansan Yi clan (한산 이씨; 韓山 李氏)
  - Younger sister – Lady Yi of the Hansan Yi clan (한산 이씨; 韓山 李氏)
  - Younger sister – Lady Yi of the Hansan Yi clan (한산 이씨; 韓山 李氏)
- Wife and children
  - Lady Kwŏn of the Andong Kwŏn clan (안동 권씨); daughter of Kwŏn Chung-dal (권중달; 權仲達)
    - Son – Yi Chong-dŏk (이종덕; 李種德)
    - Son – Yi Chong-hak (이종학; 1361 – 10 September 1392)
    - Son – Yi Chong-sŏn (이종선)

== In popular culture ==
- Portrayed by Lee Dae-ro in the 1983 MBC TV series The King of Chudong Palace.
- Portrayed by Jeon In-taek in the 2005–2006 MBC TV series Shin Don.
- Portrayed by Park Ji-il in the 2014 KBS1 TV series Jeong Do-jeon.
- Portrayed by Kim Jong-soo in the 2015–2016 SBS TV series Six Flying Dragons.

== See also ==
- List of Korean philosophers
- Yi Ji-ham
