= Kim Sisŭp =

Korean scholar and author (1435–1493)

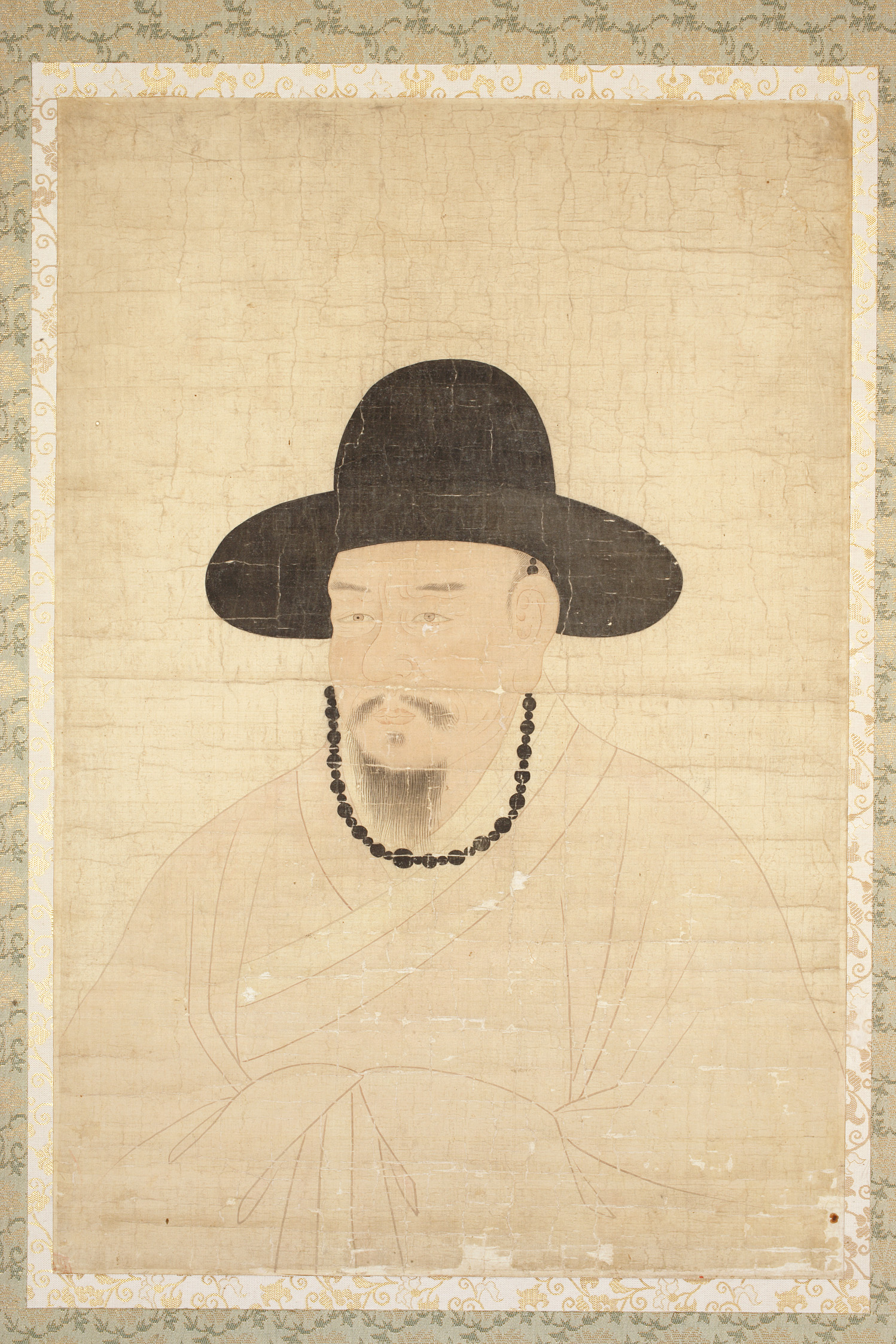

Korean name
- Hangul: 김시습
- Hanja: 金時習
- RR: Gim Siseup
- MR: Kim Sisŭp

Art name
- Hangul: 매월당
- Hanja: 梅月堂
- RR: Maewoldang
- MR: Maewŏltang

Kim Sisŭp (Korean: 김시습; Hanja: 金時習; 1435–1493) was a Korean scholar and author.

== Background ==
Kim Sisŭp hailed from the Gangneung Kim clan. His family was from the yangban class and had members who served as magistrates and military commanders. Kim was born in Seoul.

According to historical records, Kim demonstrated reading ability at eight months of age and could read The Great Learning and the Doctrine of the Mean by age five. King Sejong took notice of his abilities. Kim compiled a book of poetry called Tangyugwandongnok based on family history and experiences in the Gangwon area.

In 1453, Prince Suyang executed a coup and seized the throne from the heir Danjong of Joseon, killing him and his supporters, including nobles and Confucian scholars. This began the reign of King Sejo (1455–1468). At age twenty-one, in response to the usurpation and executions of loyalists in a failed 1456 counter-coup, Kim renounced government service and became a Buddhist monk.

Kim promoted the unity of Confucianism, Taoism, and Buddhism. He was venerated in both Confucian shrines and Buddhist temples. His work Kŭmo sinhwa (New Tales of the Golden Turtle) was composed at Yongjang Temple. The work is recognized as marking the beginning of fiction in Korea. His writings were read in Tokugawa Japan and became part of both North and South Korean literary canons.

== Works ==
Kim Sisŭp wrote Kŭmo sinhwa (New Tales of the Golden Turtle), a collection of five tales written in Classical Chinese. The work was composed at Yongjang Temple, likely between 1460 and 1470. Kŭmo sinhwa is considered the first work of fiction in Korea.

The collection was influenced by the Chinese work Jiandeng Xinhua (New Stories While Trimming the Lampwick) by Qu You. However, Kim adapted the form to Korean settings and themes. The five tales include stories of encounters between humans and supernatural beings, often involving Buddhist monks, scholars, and spirits.

Kim wrote additional works including Tangyugwandongnok, Tangyugwanseorok, and Tangyuhonamnok, which documented his travels and experiences. He also composed Siphyeondamyohae and produced approximately 30 volumes of writing during his lifetime.

Kim's writings addressed Buddhist and Confucian thought, and some works discussed governance and social hierarchy. His texts were read in Tokugawa Japan and became part of the literary canon in both North and South Korea.

When Kim died in 1493, the government made efforts to locate and preserve his works. An example of his poetry includes:

Do not sweep the fallen leaves,

For they are pleasant to hear on clear nights

In the wind, they rustle, as if sighing;

In the moonlight, their shadows flutter.

They knock on the window to wake a traveler;

Covering stairs, they hide moss.

Sad, the sight of them getting wet in the rain;

Let them wither away deep in the mountains.

== See also ==
- Korean Literature
- Gangwon
