= Sŏ Kyŏngdŏk =

Korean philosopher (1489–1546)

- Hangul: 서경덕
- Hanja: 徐敬德
- RR: Seo Gyeongdeok
- MR: Sŏ Kyŏngdŏk

Art name
- Hangul: 화담
- Hanja: 花潭
- RR: Hwadam
- MR: Hwadam

Sŏ Kyŏngdŏk (Korean: 서경덕; Hanja: 徐敬德; March 18, 1489 – August 13, 1546 (Note: In the Korean calendar (lunisolar), Sŏ was born on February 17, 1489 and died on July 7, 1546)) was a Korean Neo-Confucianist philosopher during the Joseon period. His philosophy studied materialism and phenomenology based on ancient Taoist philosophy theories absorbed by neo-Confucianism, like Yin and Yang and Ki.

== Works ==
Sŏ was a great scholar of the day. He counted among his students the famed gisaeng Hwang Jini, for whom he wrote this sijo:

마음이 어린 후이니 하는 일이 다 어리다
만중운산(萬重雲山)에 어느 님 오리마는
지는 잎 부는 바람에 행여 귄가 하노라

My heart is young
so I act young all the time.
Clouds hide this distant mountain:
who would ever visit me here?
But old leaves rustle in the wind:
I hope it’s her.

Other works:

- Hwadam chip (화담집; 花潭集) - collection of his writings
- Wŏn iki (원이기; 原理氣) - About origin of Qi
- Igi sŏl (이기설; 理氣說) - about processing of Qi
- T'aehŏ sŏl (태허설; 太虛說) - About Mu of Qi
- Kwisin sasaengnon (귀신사생론; 鬼神死生論) - about spirit of soul and life and death.

== Disciples ==
- Hwang Jini - Korean poet and artist
- Hŏ Kyun - Korean novelist, philosopher, and politician
- Yi Ji-ham (이지함) - Korean astrologer, diviner, and politician
- Heo Nanseolheon - Korean poet
- Han Paekkyŏm (한백겸) - Geographer and philosopher
- Pak Sun (박순) - Philosopher and politician

== Family ==
- Father - Sŏ Hobŏn (서호번; 徐好蕃)
- Mother - Lady Han of the Boan Han clan (보안 한씨; 保安 韓氏)
- Sibling(s)
  - Younger brother - Sŏ Sungdŏk (서숭덕; 徐崇德)
- Wives and their issue
  - Lady Yi of the Taein Yi clan (태안 이씨; 泰安 李氏); daughter Yi Kyejong (이계종; ? – January 7, 1561)
    - Son - Sŏ Ŭngga (서응가; 徐應暇)
    - Son - Sŏ Ŭnggi (서응기; 徐應麒)
    - Daughter - Lady Sŏ of the Dangseong Sŏ clan (당성 서씨)
  - Unnamed concubine
    - Son - Sŏ Ŭngbong (서응봉; 徐應鳳)
    - Son - Sŏ Ŭnggu (서응구; 徐應龜)
