= Kyŏngguk taejŏn =

Joseon legal code

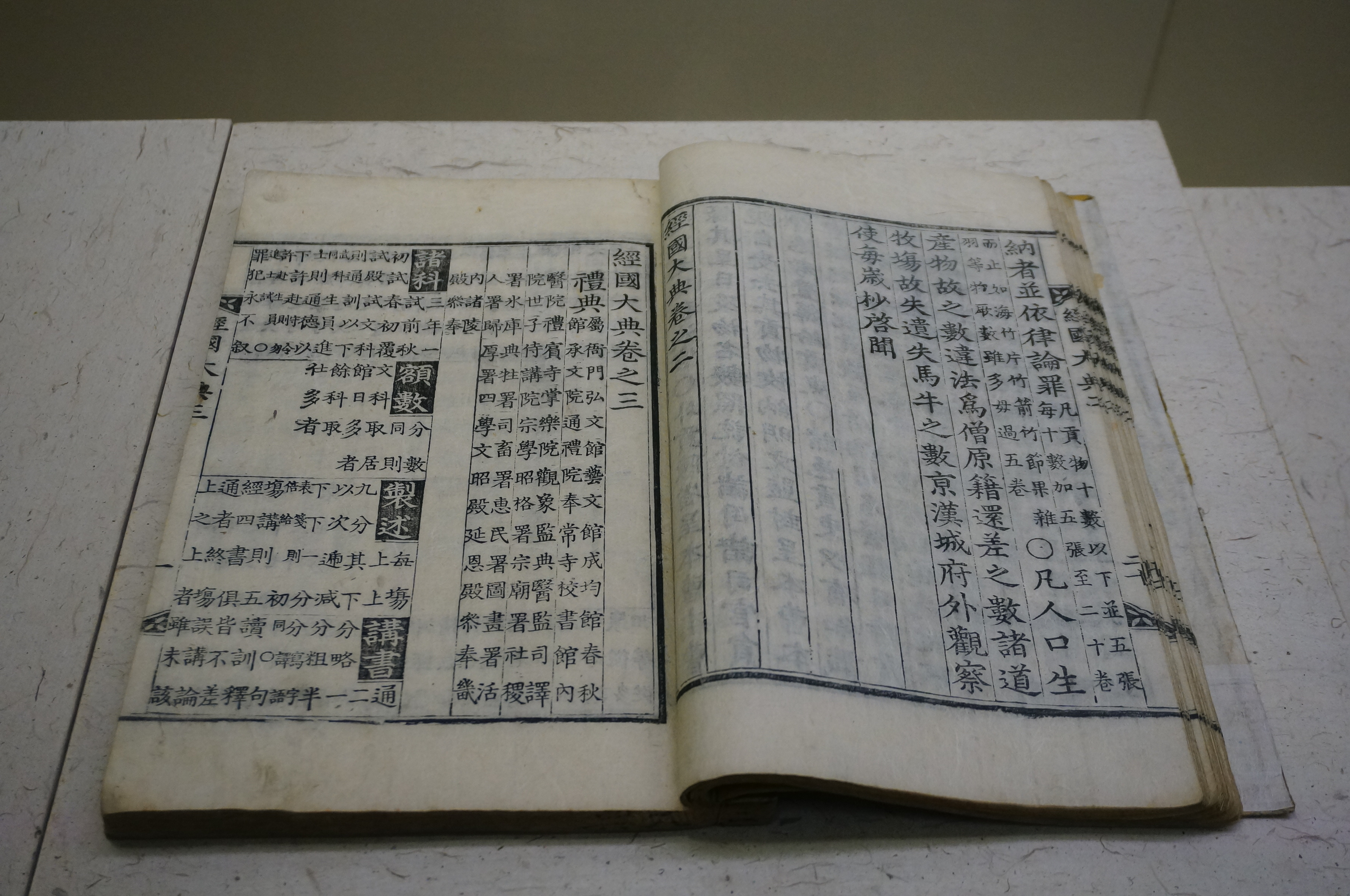
- Kyŏngguk taejŏn in the National Museum of Korea

Korean name
- Hangul: 경국대전
- Hanja: 經國大典
- RR: Gyeongguk daejeon
- MR: Kyŏngguk taejŏn

Kyŏngguk taejŏn (Korean: 경국대전; Hanja: 經國大典), name translated as the State Code or the National Code, is a code of law that comprises all the laws, customs and decrees of the late Goryeo to early Joseon periods in Korea. Sorted according to the relevant ministries (Yukyo), it had been a basis for over 500 years of Joseon politics.

The previous code of law was the Kyŏngje yukchŏn (경제육전; 經濟六典; Six Codes of Governance) and its revised edition, Sogyukchŏn (속육전; 續六典, Amended Six Codes of Governance) which were issued during the reign of the state founder, King Taejo.

The code was commissioned in 1458 by King Sejo. In 1467 (Sejo 13), the compilation of the entire book was finished and named Kyŏngguk taejŏn, but repeated revisions and supplements delayed the final publication. When Seongjong was crowned, a first revision began to be implemented in 1471 and is named Sinmyo taejŏn (신묘대전; 辛卯大典). It was then revised in 1474 and therefore named the Kabo taejŏn (갑오대전; 甲午大典). A third version, the Ŭlsa taejŏn (을사대전; 乙巳大典), was released in 1485 (Seongjong 32), and was registered as the final version.

The existing edition is a reprint from 1613 which has been preserved in the Kyujanggak Institute for Korean Studies.

== See also ==
- Yukjo
- Joseon dynasty politics
- History of Korea
