= Chŏng Mongju =

Korean scholar-official (1337–1392)

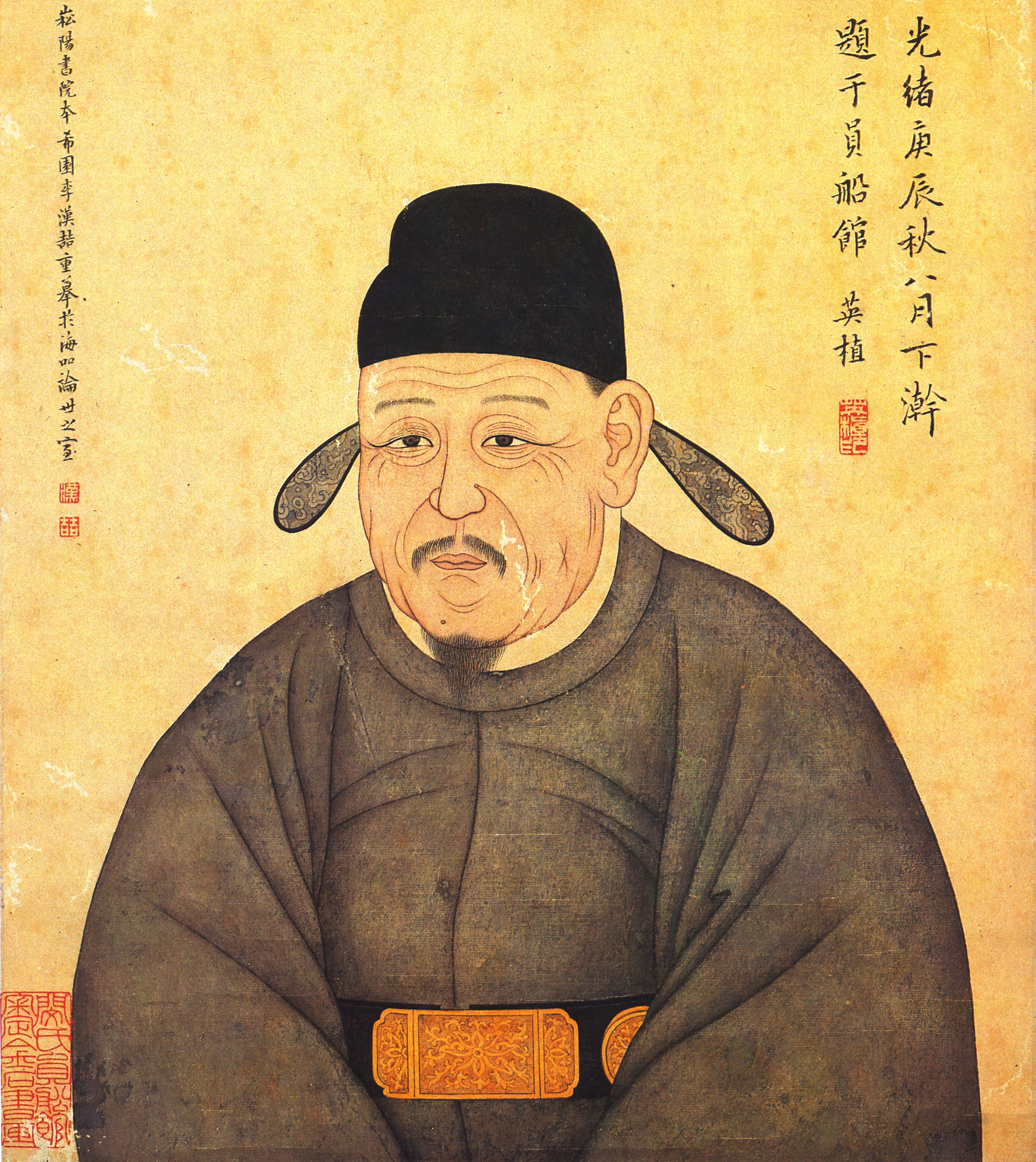

Korean name
- Hangul: 정몽주
- Hanja: 鄭夢周
- RR: Jeong Mongju
- MR: Chŏng Mongju

Art name
- Hangul: 포은
- Hanja: 圃隱
- RR: Poeun
- MR: P'oŭn

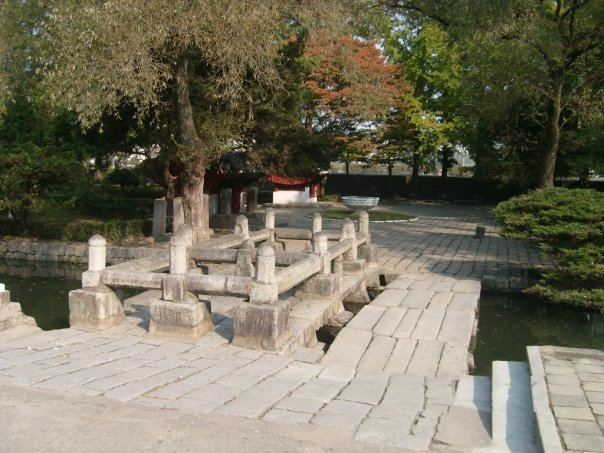
Sonjuk Bridge in Kaesong where Chŏng Mongju was assassinated

Chŏng Mongju (Korean: 정몽주; Hanja: 鄭夢周, January 13, 1337 – May 4, 1392 (Note: In the Korean calendar (lunisolar), Chŏng Mongju was born on the 22nd day, 12th month of 1337 and died on the 4th day, 4th month of 1392.)), also known by his art name P'oŭn (포은), was a Korean statesman, diplomat, philosopher, poet, calligrapher and reformist of the Goryeo period. He was a major figure of opposition to the transition from the Goryeo (918–1392) to Joseon (1392–1897) periods.

As the last great personality from the late Goryeo period, exceptional in all aspects of academics, diplomacy, economics, military and politics, and trying to reform Goryeo while maintaining the declining kingdom, he opposed the Goryeo general Yi Sŏng-gye (the first king of the future Joseon dynasty) who was a radical revolutionary against the rotten Goryeo dynasty. Due to his loyalty to Goryeo, Chŏng Mongju was eventually assassinated by five men of Yi Pang-wŏn (the fifth son of Yi Sŏng-gye and the third king of Joseon dynasty).

== Biography ==
Chŏng Mongju was born in Yeongcheon, Gyeongsang Province to a family from the Yeonil Jeong clan (연일 정씨; 延日 鄭氏). He was the eldest of five siblings.

At the age of 23, he took three different civil service literary examinations (gwageo) and received the highest marks possible on each of them. In 1367, he became an instructor of Neo-Confucianism at the Gukjagam, then called Songgyungwan, whilst simultaneously holding a government position, and was a faithful public servant to King U. The king had great confidence in his wide knowledge and good judgment, and so he participated in various national projects and his scholarly works earned him great respect in the Goryeo court.

In 1372, Chŏng Mongju was sent as a diplomatic envoy to the Ming Dynasty. Around this time, because the Waegu (왜구; 倭寇 - the Japanese pirates) invasions of the Korean Peninsula were extreme, in 1377 Chŏng Mongju was dispatched as a delegate to Kyūshū in Japan. His negotiations led to promises of Japanese aid in defeating the pirates. At this time, the tandai of Kyūshū, Imagawa Sadayo, made several repressions against the Waegu, probably as a direct result of Chŏng Mongju's diplomacy. There is a reason to believe that Sadayo and Chŏng negotiated directly, as later, Sadayo lost his position due to unlawful negotiations with Goryeo. Chŏng Mongju traveled to the Ming Dynasty's capital city in 1384 and the negotiations with the Chinese led to peace with the Ming Dynasty in 1385. He also founded an institute devoted to the theories of Confucianism.

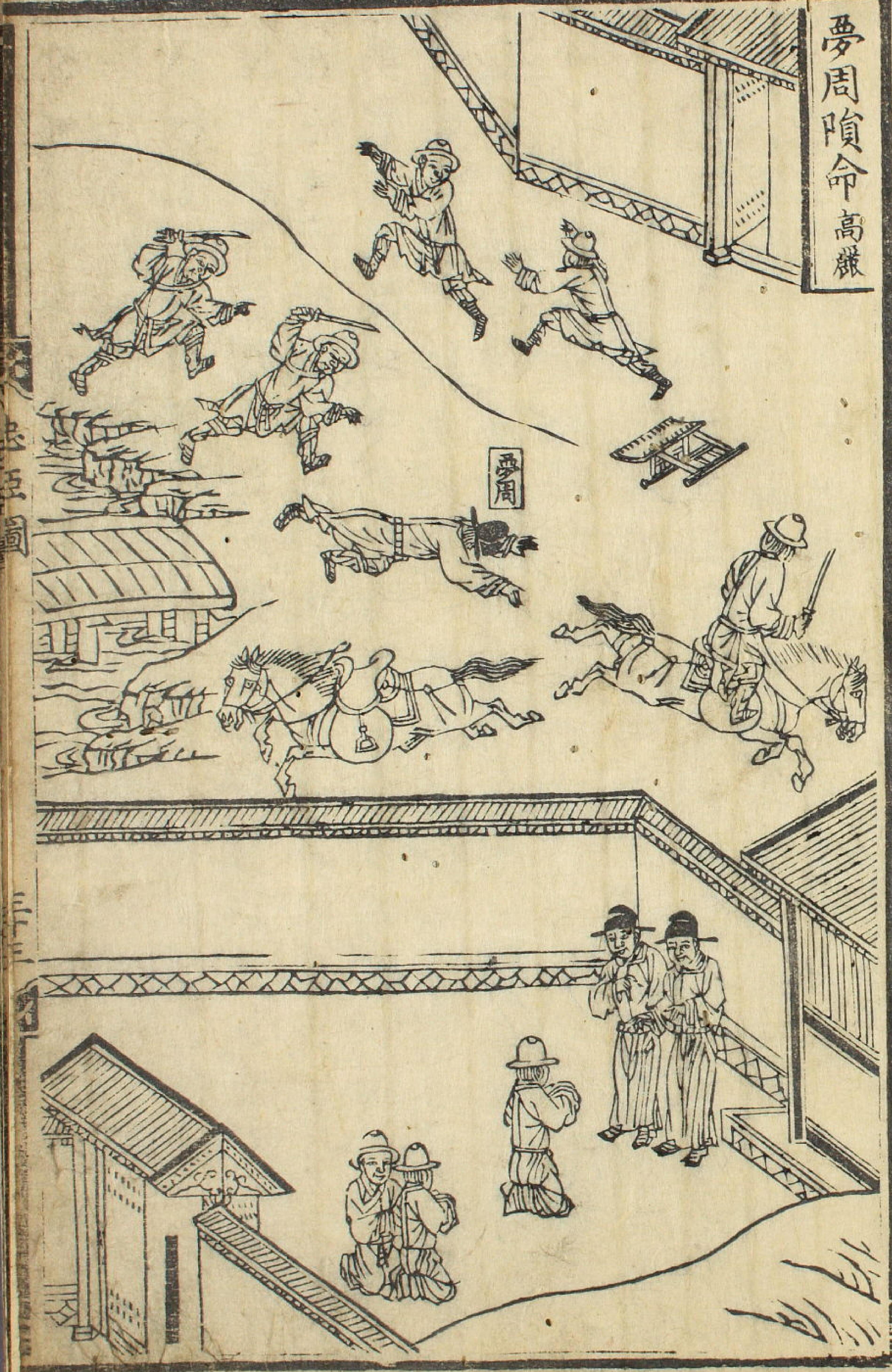
Assassination of Chŏng Mongju

Chŏng Mongju had originally been a moderate supporter of Yi Sŏng-gye and supported his take-over of the court after the Wihwado Retreat from 1388. Although initially supporting some of Yi's moderate reforms, Chŏng soon realized that Yi and some of his more radical supporters, such as Chŏng To-jŏn and Cho Chun, were planning to establish a new dynasty. Due to Chŏng Mongju's strong Neo-Confucian beliefs, he was a staunch Goryeo loyalist and opposed any attempts to end the Goryeo Dynasty and found a new one, calling it an immoral act to do so.

On April 9, 1392, Yi Sŏng-gye was seriously injured in a horse-back riding accident. Chŏng planned to use this opportunity to destroy Yi's faction. When Yi Pang-wŏn (later Taejong of Joseon), the fifth son of Yi Sŏng-gye, managed to bring back his father to the capital from site of the accident, Chŏng became unsure of the true extent of Yi Sŏng-gye's injuries. On April 26, Chŏng went to Yi's residence to assess the extent of his injuries. During a banquet held for Chŏng, he and Yi Pang-wŏn exchanged poems. Yi Pang-wŏn recited a poem (Hayeoga, 하여가 / 何如歌) to dissuade Chŏng Mongju from remaining loyal to the Goryeo Dynasty, but Chŏng Mongju answered with another poem (Dansimga, 단심가 / 丹心歌) that affirmed his strong loyalty. As a result, on his way home, Chŏng Mongju was assassinated on the Sonjuk Bridge in Gaeseong, by five of Yi Pang-wŏn's subordinates. Yi Sŏng-gye is said to have lamented Chŏng Mongju's death and rebuked his son, because Chŏng Mongju was a highly regarded politician by the common people. The bridge where Chŏng Mongju was murdered, nowadays in North Korea, has now become a national monument of the country. A brown spot on one of the stones is said to be Chŏng Mongju's bloodstain and is said to become red whenever it rains. Currently, his direct surviving descendants are his 28th – 36th generation, who reside all over the world.

The 474-year-old Goryeo Dynasty symbolically ended with Chŏng Mongju's death and was followed by the Joseon period for 505 years (1392–1897). Chŏng Mongju's noble death symbolizes his faithful allegiance to the king and Goryeo, and later he was venerated even by Joseon monarchs. Chŏng Mongju's murderer, Yi Pang-wŏn (later Taejong of Joseon), inscribed the words "Defender of Goryeo" on his tombstone to praise his loyalty. In 1517, 125 years after his death, he was canonized into Sungkyunkwan (the National Neo-Confucian Academy) alongside, in time, of other Korean sages such as Yi Hwang (Toegye, 1501–1570) and Yi I (Yulgok, 1536–1584). His grave is located in Yongin, Gyeonggi Province, and he was buried next to his wife.

The 11th pattern of ITF Taekwondo is called Po-Eun, named after Chŏng. The pattern is performed as part of the testing syllabus for the level of 2nd-degree black belt. The diagram ( — ) represents Chŏng Mongju's unerring loyalty to his king and his country towards the end of the Goryeo Dynasty.

== Poems ==
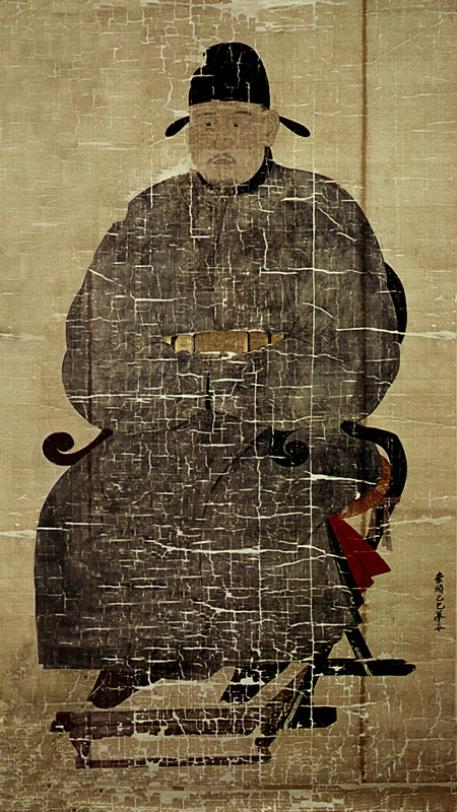
Portrait of Chŏng Mongju

=== Yi Pang-wŏn's sijo (poem) – Hayeoga (하여가 / 何如歌) ===
이런들 어떠하리 저런들 어떠하리 此亦何如彼亦何如。 (차역하여피역하여)

만수산 드렁칡이 얽어진들 어떠하리 城隍堂後垣頹落亦何如。 (성황당후원퇴락역하여)

우리도 이같이 얽어져 백년까지 누리리라 我輩若此爲不死亦何如。 (아배약차위불사역하여)

(Based on the Hanja)

What shall it be: this or that?

The walls behind the temple of the city's deity has fallen* - shall it be this?

Or if we survive together nonetheless - shall it be that?

(* Yi Pang-wŏn is declaring the death of the Goryeo Dynasty's era.)

=== Chŏng Mongju's sijo (poem) - Dansimga (단심가 / 丹心歌) ===
이몸이 죽고 죽어 일백 번 고쳐 죽어 此身死了死了一百番更死了。 (차신사료사료일백번갱사료)

백골이 진토되어 넋이라도 있고 없고 白骨爲塵土魂魄有也無。 (백골위진토혼백유무야)

임 향한 일편 단심이야 가실 줄이 있으랴 向主一片丹心寧有改理也歟。 (향주일편단심유개리여)

Though I die and die again a hundred times,

That my bones turn to dust, whether my soul remains or not,

Ever loyal to my Lord, how can this red heart ever fade away?

== Books ==
- P'oŭn chip (포은집; 圃隱集)
- P'oŭn sigo (포은시고; 圃隱詩藁)

== Family ==
- Father
  - Chŏng Un-gwan (정운관; 鄭云瓘; 1311–1355)
- Mother
  - Grand Princess Consort Pyŏn of the Yeongcheon Yi clan (변한국대부인 영천 이씨; 1313–1365)
- Siblings
  - Younger brother - Chŏng Kwa (정과; 鄭過; 1339–1392)
  - Younger brother - Chŏng Hu (정후; 鄭厚; 1341–?)
  - Younger brother - Chŏng To (정도; 鄭蹈; 1343–?)
  - Younger sister - Lady Chŏng (정씨; ?–1400)
- Wife and children
  - Princess Gyeongsun of the Gyeongju Yi clan (경순택주 경주 이씨; 敬順宅主 慶州 李氏; 1337–December 12, 1392)
    - Son - Chŏng Chong-sŏng (정종성; 鄭宗誠; 1374–1442) (Note: His illegitimate daughter became a concubine for Han Myŏnghoe)
    - Son - Chŏng Chong-bon (정종본; 鄭宗本; 1377–1443)
    - Daughter - Lady Chŏng (정씨; 1377–?)
    - Daughter - Lady Chŏng (정씨; 1388–?)
    - Daughter - Lady Chŏng (정씨; 1390–?)
- Concubine and children
  - Unnamed concubine (1341–?)
    - Son - Chŏng Chong-hwa (정종화; 1375–?) (Note: His only child and daughter became a concubine to Han Myŏnghoe along with his half-niece)
    - Son - Chŏng Chong-ham (정종함; 1377–?)
    - Daughter - Lady Chŏng (정씨; 1390–?)

== In popular culture ==
- Portrayed by Hong Gye-il in the 1983 MBC TV series The King of Chudong Palace.
- Portrayed by Park Joon-hyuk in the 2012–2013 SBS TV series The Great Seer.
- Portrayed by Im Ho in the 2014 KBS1 TV series Jeong Do-jeon.
- Portrayed by Kim Eui-sung in the 2015 SBS TV series Six Flying Dragons.
- Portrayed by Choi Jong-hwan in the 2021–2022 KBS1 TV series The King of Tears, Lee Bang-won.

== See also ==
- List of Goryeo people
- Korean philosophy
- Tears of the Dragon (TV series)
- Chŏng To-jŏn
