= Chŏng Tojŏn =

Korean scholar-official (1342–1398)

Chŏng Tojŏn 정도전
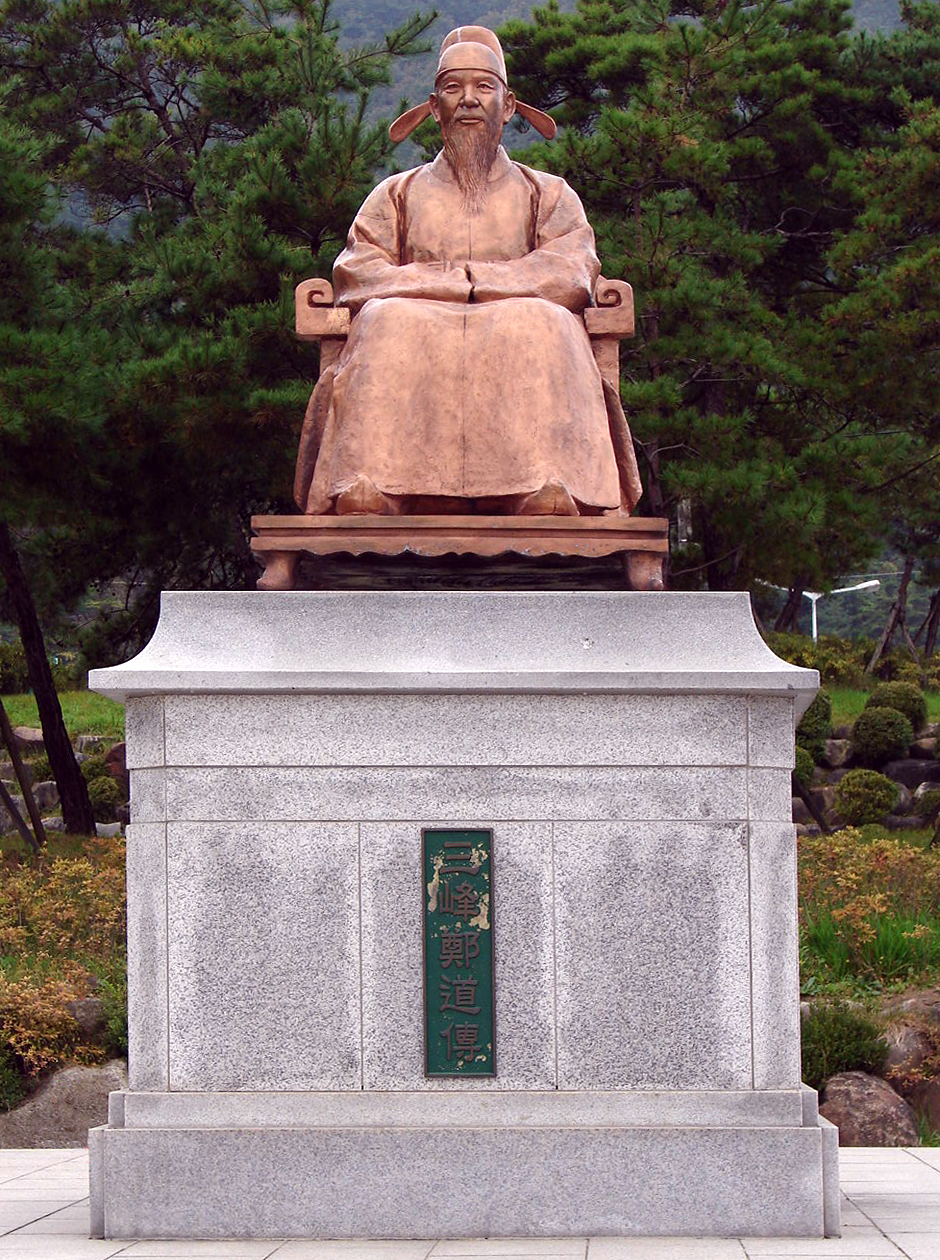

Personal details
- Born: October 6, 1342 Danyang County, Goryeo
- Died: October 6, 1398 (aged 56) Hanseong-bu, Joseon
- Spouse: Princess Gyeongsuk
- Children: Chŏng Chin; Chŏng Yŏng; Chŏng Yu
- Parent(s): Chŏng Un'gyŏng (Father); Lady U of Yeongju U clan (Mother)

Korean name
- Hangul: 정도전
- Hanja: 鄭道傳
- RR: Jeong Dojeon
- MR: Chŏng Tojŏn

Art name
- Hangul: 삼봉
- Hanja: 三峰
- RR: Sambong
- MR: Sambong

Courtesy name
- Hangul: 종지
- Hanja: 宗之
- RR: Jongji
- MR: Chongji

Posthumous name
- Hangul: 문헌
- Hanja: 文憲
- RR: Munheon
- MR: Munhŏn

Chŏng Tojŏn (Korean: 정도전; Hanja: 鄭道傳; October 6, 1342 – October 6, 1398), also known by his art name Sambong (삼봉), was a prominent Korean scholar-official during the late Goryeo to the early Joseon periods. Chŏng Tojŏn was an adviser to the Joseon founder Yi Sŏnggye and also the principal architect of the Joseon dynasty's policies, laying down the kingdom's ideological, institutional, and legal frameworks which would govern it for five centuries. He was killed by prince Yi Pangwŏn in 1398 over a conflict regarding the succession of Taejo.

== Biography ==
=== Background and early career ===
Chŏng Tojŏn was born from a noble family, the Bonghwa Chŏng clan (봉화 정씨; 奉化 鄭氏), in Yeongju, Goryeo. His maternal grandmother was a slave according to the Veritable Records, though the credibility of this account is called into question. His family had emerged from commoner status some four generations before, and slowly climbed up the ladder of government service. His father was the first in the family to obtain a high post. Despite all his difficulties, he became a student of Yi Che-hyŏn and along with other leading thinkers of the time, such as Chŏng Mong-ju, his penetrating intelligence started to affect the Korean politics.

=== Relationship with Yi Sŏnggye ===
Chŏng Tojŏn's ties with Yi Sŏnggye and the foundation of Joseon were extremely close. He is said to have compared his relationship to Yi Sŏnggye, to that between Zhang Liang and Emperor Gaozu of Han. Chŏng Tojŏn's political ideas had a lasting impact on Joseon Dynasty politics and laws. The two first became acquainted in 1383, when Chŏng Tojŏn visited Yi Sŏnggye at his quarters in Hamgyong province. After Yi Sŏnggye (Taejo of Joseon) founded Joseon in July 1392, he appointed Chŏng Tojŏn to the highest civilian and military office simultaneously, entrusting him with all necessary power to establish the new dynasty. Deciding all policies from military affairs, diplomacy, and down to education, he laid down Joseon's political system and tax laws, replaced Buddhism with Confucianism as national religion, moved the capital from Kaesong to Hanyang (present-day Seoul), changed the kingdom's political system from feudalism to highly centralized bureaucracy, and wrote a code of laws that eventually became Joseon's constitution. He even decided the names of each palace, eight provinces, and districts in the capital. He also worked to free many slaves and reformed land policy.

=== Conflict with Yi Pangwŏn ===
After Joseon was established in July 1392, Chŏng Tojŏn soon collided with Yi Pangwŏn over the question of choosing the crown prince, the future successor to Yi Sŏng-gye (Taejo of Joseon). Of all princes, Yi Pangwŏn contributed most to his father's rise to power and expected to be appointed as the crown prince even though he was Taejo's fifth son. However, Chŏng Tojŏn persuaded Taejo to appoint his young eighth son Yi Pangsŏk (Yi Pangwŏn's half-brother) as the crown prince. Their conflict arose because Chŏng Tojŏn saw Joseon as a kingdom led by ministers while the king was to be largely symbolic figure, whereas Yi Pangwŏn wanted to establish the absolute monarchy ruled directly by the king. Both sides were well aware of each other's great animosity and were getting ready to strike first. After the sudden death of Queen Sindeok in 1398, while King Taejo was still in mourning for her (his second wife and mother of Yi Bang-sŏk), Yi Bang-wŏn struck first by raiding the palace and killed Chŏng Tojŏn and his supporters as well as Queen Sindeok's two sons including the crown prince, in a coup that came to be known as the First Strife of the Princes. Taejo, who helplessly watched his favorite sons and ministers being killed by Yi Pangwŏn's forces, abdicated in disgust and remained angry with Yi Bang-wŏn well after Yi Bang-wŏn became the third king of Joseon, Taejong of Joseon.

For much of Joseon history, Chŏng Tojŏn was vilified or ignored despite his contribution to its founding. He was finally rehabilitated in 1865 in recognition of his role in designing Gyeongbokgung (main palace). Earlier Chŏngjo published a collection of Chŏng Tojŏn's writings in 1791. Chŏng Tojŏn's once-close friend and rival Chŏng Mong-ju, who was assassinated by Yi Pangwŏn for remaining loyal to the Goryeo Dynasty, was honored by Yi Bang-wŏn posthumously and was remembered as symbol of loyalty throughout the Joseon Dynasty despite being its most determined foe.

Two ideas set forth by Chŏng Tojŏn strained his relationship with Yi Pangwŏn. Chŏng believed that the new dynasty, Joseon, should be governed primarily by the neo-Confucianist officialdom and not by absolute monarchy. Such thinking of Chŏng is detailed in his book Joseon Gyeonggukjeon (Korean: 조선경국전; Hanja: 朝鮮經國典), on which the official state legal code, Gyeongguk daejeon, is based. A scene in the Veritable Records describes Yi Sŏnggye praising Chŏng for Joseon Gyeonggukjeon, but it is speculated that Yi Sŏng-gye was not fully literate and did not comprehend the extent of what Chŏng was suggesting. However, Yi Pangwŏn, who had passed the civil service examination of Goryeo, would have understood the implications of Chŏng's thinking.

Chŏng also pushed for the abolishment of private armies. Shortly after Joseon's founding, Chŏng and other prominent scholar-officials set out to identify the trappings of Goryeo that precipitated its demise and put forth reform ideas. Unequal land ownership and private armies were generally agreed to have contributed to rampant corruption. Chŏng argued that land should be returned to the central government (and distributed to small farmers) and that private armies should be abolished, including those of the princes. Yi Pangwŏn was not pleased according to the records where Chŏng demanded that all private armies be sent to the central government to be trained for the military campaign into Liaodong that Chŏng claimed was necessary. None of the princes complied.

== Death ==
In 1398, Chŏng Tojŏn was slain by Yi Pangwŏn in the First Strife of the Princes. It is unclear exactly how he died, and the accounts in the Veritable Records and Sambong chip do not agree on the precise way in which he died. The Veritable Records depict that Chŏng Tojŏn begged Yi Pangwŏn for his life, whereas Sambong chip portrays a more dignified last moment in which Chŏng left a death poem lamenting his poor judgment and gracefully accepted his death. The credibility of either account is questioned. The story conveyed in the Veritable Records could be a result of the vilification of Chŏng throughout Joseon history. It is also argued that Yi Pangwŏn could not have afforded to allow Chŏng the time to compose a poem in the midst of a full-blown coup.

== Intellectual activity ==
Chŏng Tojŏn was a major opponent of Buddhism at the end of the Goryeo period. He was a student of Zhu Xi's thought. Using Cheng-Zhu school's Neo-Confucian philosophy as the basis of his anti-Buddhist polemic, he criticized Buddhism in a number of treatises as being corrupt in its practices, and nihilistic and antinomian in its doctrines. One of the more famous of these treatises was the Bulssi Japbyeon ("Array of Critiques Against Buddhism"). He was a founding member of the Sungkyunkwan, the royal Confucian academy, and one of its early faculty members.

Chŏng Tojŏn was among the first Korean scholars to refer to his thought as Silhak, or "practical learning." However, he is not usually numbered among the members of the silhak tradition, which arose much later in the Joseon period.

== Political thought ==
Chŏng Tojŏn argued that the government, including the king himself, exists for the sake of the people. Its legitimacy could only come from benevolent public service. It was largely on this basis that he legitimized the overthrow of the Goryeo dynasty, arguing that the Goryeo rulers had given up their right to rule.

Chŏng Tojŏn divided society into three classes: (a) a large lower class of agricultural laborers and craftsmen, (b) a middle class of literati, and (c) a small upper class of bureaucrats. Anyone outside this system, including Buddhist monks, shamans, and entertainers, he considered a "vicious" threat to the social fabric.

== Reception ==
Immediatedly following his death, he was criticized as a betrayer of the Goryeo dynasty and a greedy politician who had attempted to take power from his king. For the next 300 years, he was regarded as a treacherous villain. For example, Song Si-yŏl, the most reputable philosopher of the 17th century Joseon dynasty, always included a word "insidious" when he mentioned about Chŏng Tojŏn. Yi Ik, also a renowned Korean philosopher of the Middle Age of the dynasty, referred to him as "a figure who deserved to be killed" in his book, Seong Ho Sa Seol.

However, with the surge of revisionism in the 18th century, his work started to be assessed with a different angle. Chŏngjo, 22nd King of Joseon, republished Sambong chip, recognizing his work building the political systems and intellectual foundations of the dynasty.

== Works ==
- Sambong chip (삼봉집; 三峯集), a three-chapter collection of poetry, but according to the Encyclopedia of Korean Culture, a collection of works published in 1397 and supplemented and republished in 1781 that consist of his poetry, prose, philosophy, and institutional reform plans
- Chosŏn Kyŏngguk chŏn (조선경국전; 朝鮮經國典) - volumes 7 & 8 of the 1791 edition of Sambong chip
- Taemyŏngnyul Chosŏnŏhae (대명률조선어해; 大明律朝鮮語解)
- Kyŏngje mun'gam (경제문감; 經濟文鑑) (Economic Writings)
- Bulssi Japbyeon (불씨잡변; 佛氏雜辨)
- Simmun ch'ŏndap (심문천답; 心問天答) - contained in volumes 9 & 10 of the 1791 edition of Sambong chip
- Simgiri (심기리; 心氣理) a criticism of Buddhism and Taoism
- Hakcha chinamdo (학자지남도; 學者指南圖)
- Chinmaek togyŏl (진맥도결; 診脈圖結) (Pulse diagnosis)
- Koryŏ Kuksa (고려국사; 高麗國史) (National History of Koryŏ) 1395
- Chinpŏp (진법; 陣法) - volume 13 of the 1791 edition of Sambong chip
- Goryeosa (고려사; 高麗史)

=== English translations ===
- Korea's Great Buddhist-Confucian Debate: The Treatises of Chŏng Tojŏn (Sambong) and Hamhŏ Tŭkt'ong (Kihwa). Translated by Muller, Charles. University of Hawai'i Press. 2015. ISBN 978-0-8248-5380-8.
- Seeking Order in a Tumultuous Age: The Writings of Chŏng Tojŏn, a Korean Neo-Confucian. Translated by Robinson, David M. University of Hawai'i Press. 2016. ISBN 9780824859442.

In addition, the translation of his Chinese poem Plum is included in Lee, Peter H (1981). Anthology of Korean Literature: From Early Times to The Nineteenth Century. University of Hawai'i Press. ISBN 9780824807399.

== Family ==
- Father
  - Chŏng Un'gyŏng (정운경; 鄭云敬; 1305–1366)
- Mother
  - Lady U of Yeongju U clan (증 정경부인 영주 우씨; 贈 貞敬夫人 榮州 禹氏)
    - Grandfather - U Yŏn (우연; 禹淵)
- Siblings
  - Younger sister - Lady Chŏng of the Bonghwa Chŏng clan (봉화 정씨)
  - Younger brother - Chŏng Tojon (정도존; 鄭道存; ?–1398)
  - Younger brother - Chŏng Tobok (정도복; 鄭道復; 1351–1435)
- Wife
  - Princess Gyeongsuk, Lady Ch'oe of the Gyeongju Ch'oe clan (경숙택주 경주 최씨; 慶淑宅主 慶州 崔氏)
    - Son - Chŏng Chin (정진; 鄭津; 1361–1427)
    - Son - Chŏng Yŏng (정영; 鄭泳; ?–1398)
    - Son - Chŏng Yu (정유; 鄭遊; ?–1398)

== In popular culture ==
- Portrayed by Lee Ho-jae in the 1983 MBC TV series 500 Years of Joseon: The King of Chudong Palace.
- Portrayed by Kim Heung-gi in the 1996–1998 KBS1 TV series Tears of the Dragon.
- Portrayed by Baek Seung-hyeon in the 2012–2013 SBS TV series The Great Seer.
- Portrayed by Cho Jae-hyun and Kang Yi-seok in the 2014 KBS1 series Jeong Do-jeon.
- Portrayed by Ahn Nae-sang in the 2014 film The Pirates.
- Portrayed by Kim Myung-min in the 2015–2016 SBS TV series Six Flying Dragons.
- Portrayed by Lee Kwang-gi in the 2021-22 KBS1 TV series The King of Tears, Lee Bang-won.

== See also ==
- List of Korean philosophers
- Korean philosophy
- Korean literature
- Joseon Dynasty politics
