= Yeongbi Choe =

Goryeo consort

Yeong-bi Choe 영비 최씨
- Spouse: U of Goryeo
- Clan: Dongju Ch'oe clan
- Father: Ch'oe Yŏng
- Mother: Lady Ŭn
- Religion: Buddhism

Consort Yeong of the Dongju Choe clan (Korean: 영비 최씨; Hanja: 寧妃 崔氏) was a Korean royal consort as the second wife of King U of Goryeo.

== Biography ==
=== Early life and palace life ===
Born the daughter of the famed general Ch'oe Yŏng and his concubine Lady Ŭn, Royal Consort Yeong entered the harem of King U in 1388 at the same time as consorts Jeong and Seon. She was established in a mansion named Yeonghye (영혜부), and, of all the consorts, ranked second only to Royal Consort Geun. The additional staff required for the three new consorts represented a substantial burden on palace resources, however, and King U increased the tribute to be paid in grain for the year to meet the palace's needs.

In the midst of planning for the assault on Liaodong in Ming territory, King U left the palace with Royal Consort Yeong and her father to go hunting in Seohae-do. A few months later, Royal Consort Yeong accompanied the king to visit Pubyok Pavilion, where he tried to kill a coachman, first with a bow and arrow and then by fighting him. Her father reproached the king, saying that the man would inevitably die due to the gods' will, but the king killed the man anyway.

=== After King U's deposal ===
In June 1388, the general Yi Sŏng-gye launched a coup against King U. He defeated Ch'oe Yŏng's forces at Palgakjeon (팔각전), where the king was hiding with Royal Consort Yeong. The soldiers surrounded the building, and Ch'oe Yŏng went out to them after the king had held his hand and wept. The soldiers then demanded that Royal Consort Yeong be sent out, but the king refused, saying that he would also have to go out if she went. As a result, several generals instructed their forces to withdraw and guard the palaces instead. The king was persuaded to exit and go to Ganghwa Island, leaving Royal Consort Yeong with Princess Myeongsun. King U's young son by Royal Consort Geun was then placed on the throne.

=== Exile ===
Aside from Royal Consort Geun, all of King U's consorts were expelled from the palace, after which Consort Yeong joined the king in exile. When he was killed in 1389, she reportedly cried, 'everything I have suffered was caused by my father.' She refused to eat for 10 days and cried night and day, sleeping only when hugging the dead king's body. On receiving a grain of rice, she would pound it into a fine powder as a sacrifice for the dead, and all who saw her pitied her.

== In popular culture ==
- Portrayed by Kim Soo-yeon in the 1983 KBS TV series Foundation of the Kingdom.
- Portrayed by Kang Seok-ran in the 1983 MBC TV series The King of Chudong Palace.
