= 2012 SBS Drama Awards =

20th edition of award ceremony

- Date: December 31, 2012
- Site: SBS Prism Tower in Sangam-dong, Mapo District, Seoul
- Hosted by: Lee Dong-wook; Jung Ryeo-won

Television coverage
- Network: SBS

The 2012 SBS Drama Awards is a ceremony honoring the best performances in television on the SBS network for the year 2012. It took place on December 31, 2012, at the SBS Prism Tower in Sangam-dong, Mapo District, Seoul, and was hosted by actor Lee Dong-wook and actress Jung Ryeo-won.

== Nominations and winners ==
Complete list of nominees and winners:

(Winners denoted in bold)

Grand Prize (Daesang)	Achievement Award
**Son Hyun-joo** - **The Chaser as Baek Hong-suk**	**Kim Eun-sook** - **A Gentleman's Dignity**
Top Excellence Award, Actor in a Miniseries	Top Excellence Award, Actress in a Miniseries
**Lee Min-ho** - **Faith as Choi Young**; Kim Myung-min - The King of Dramas as Anthony Kim; Lee Beom-soo - History of a Salaryman as Yoo-bang; Son Hyun-joo - The Chaser as Baek Hong-suk	**Jung Ryeo-won** - **History of a Salaryman as Baek Yeo-chi,** **The King of Dramas as Lee Go-eun**; Kim Hee-sun - Faith as Yoo Eun-soo; Shin Se-kyung - Fashion King as Lee Ga-young
Top Excellence Award, Actor in a Drama Special	Top Excellence Award, Actress in a Drama Special
**So Ji-sub** - **Phantom as Kim Woo-hyun/Park Gi-young**; Ji Jin-hee - The Great Seer as Yi Seong-gye; Ji Sung - The Great Seer as Mok Ji-sang	**Han Ji-min** - **Rooftop Prince as Park-ha/Hong Bu-yong**; Kim So-yeon - The Great Seer as Hae-in; Ku Hye-sun - Take Care of Us, Captain as Han Da-jin
Top Excellence Award, Actor in a Weekend/Daily Drama	Top Excellence Award, Actress in a Weekend/Daily Drama
**Jang Dong-gun** - **A Gentleman's Dignity as Kim Do-jin**; Park Yong-woo - My Lover, Madame Butterfly as Lee Woo-jae; Shin Hyun-joon - Dummy Mommy as Choi Go-man	**Kim Ha-neul** - **A Gentleman's Dignity as Seo Yi-soo**; Chae Shi-ra - Five Fingers as Chae Yeong-rang; Ha Hee-ra - Dummy Mommy as Kim Sun-young
Excellence Award, Actor in a Miniseries	Excellence Award, Actress in a Miniseries
**Kim Sang-joong** - **The Chaser as Kang Dong-yoon**; Jung Gyu-woon - History of a Salaryman as Choi Hang-woo; Yoo Ah-in - Fashion King as Kang Young-gul; Yu Oh-seong - Faith as Ki Chul	**Kim Sung-ryung** - **The Chaser as Seo Ji-soo**; Hong Soo-hyun - History of a Salaryman as Cha Woo-hee; Jang Mi-hee - Fashion King as Madame Jo; Oh Ji-eun - The King of Dramas as Sung Min-ah
Excellence Award, Actor in a Drama Special	Excellence Award, Actress in a Drama Special
**Park Yoochun** - **Rooftop Prince as Prince Lee Gak/Yong Tae-yong**; Lee Chun-hee - Take Care of Us, Captain as Kang Dong-soo; Song Chang-eui - The Great Seer as Lee Jung-geun; Um Ki-joon - Phantom as Jo Hyun-min	**Jeong Yu-mi** - **Rooftop Prince as Hong Se-na/Hong Hwa-yong**; Lee Yeon-hee - Phantom as Yoo Kang-mi; Lee Yoon-ji - The Great Seer as Ban-ya; Yoo Sun - Take Care of Us, Captain as Choi Ji-won
Excellence Award, Actor in a Weekend/Daily Drama	Excellence Award, Actress in a Weekend/Daily Drama
**Kim Soo-ro** - **A Gentleman's Dignity as Im Tae-san**; Ji Chang-wook - Five Fingers as Yoo In-ha; Ju Ji-hoon - Five Fingers as Yoo Ji-ho; Kim Jung-hyun - My Lover, Madame Butterfly as Kim Chan-gi	**Shin Eun-kyung** - **Still You as Cha Soon-young**; Jeon Mi-seon - Five Fingers as Song Nam-joo; Yoon Se-ah - A Gentleman's Dignity as Hong Se-ra; Yum Jung-ah - My Lover, Madame Butterfly as Nam Na-bi
Special Acting Award, Actor in a Miniseries	Special Acting Award, Actress in a Miniseries
**Lee Deok-hwa** - **History of a Salaryman as Jin Si-hwang**; Jo Jae-yoon - The Chaser as Park Yong-sik; Ryu Deok-hwan - Faith as King Gongmin; Ryu Seung-soo - The Chaser as Choi Jung-woo	**Jang Shin-young** - **The Chaser as Shin Hye-ra**; Kim Do-yeon - The Chaser as Song Mi-yeon; Kim Seo-hyung - History of a Salaryman as Mo Ga-bi; Shin Eun-jung - Faith as Hwasuin
Special Acting Award, Actor in a Drama Special	Special Acting Award, Actress in a Drama Special
**Kwak Do-won** - **Phantom as Kwon Hyuk-joo**; Jang Hyun-sung - Phantom as Jeon Jae-wook; Jo Min-ki - The Great Seer as Lee In-im; Lee Tae-sung - Rooftop Prince as Yong Tae-mu/Prince Muchang	**Lee Jin** - **The Great Seer as young Young-ji**; Oh Hyun-kyung - The Great Seer as Soo Ryun-gae; Song Ha-yoon - Phantom as Choi Seung-yeon; Song Ok-sook - Rooftop Prince as Gong Man-ok
Special Acting Award, Actor in a Weekend/Daily Drama	Special Acting Award, Actress in a Weekend/Daily Drama
**Kim Min-jong** - **A Gentleman's Dignity as Choi Yoon**; **Lee Jong-hyuk** - **A Gentleman's Dignity as Lee Jung-rok**; Jeon No-min - Five Fingers as Kim Jung-wook; Jo Hee-bong - Only Because It's You as Ma Do-yo	**Kim Jung-nan** - **A Gentleman's Dignity as Park Min-sook**; Cha Hwa-yeon - Five Fingers as Na Gye-hwa; Wang Bit-na - Still You as Kang Chae-rin; Yoo In-young - Dummy Mommy as Oh Chae-rin
Netizen Popularity Award, Actor	Netizen Popularity Award, Actress
**Park Yoochun** - **Rooftop Prince as Prince Lee Gak/Yong Tae-yong**; Choi Minho - To the Beautiful You as Kang Tae-joon; Choi Siwon - The King of Dramas as Kang Hyun-min; Jang Dong-gun - A Gentleman's Dignity as Kim Do-jin; Ji Jin-hee - The Great Seer as Yi Seong-gye; Ji Sung - The Great Seer as Mok Ji-sang; Ju Ji-hoon - Five Fingers as Yoo Ji-ho; Jung Gyu-woon - History of a Salaryman as Choi Hang-woo; Kim Min-jong - A Gentleman's Dignity as Choi Yoon; Kim Myung-min - The King of Dramas as Anthony Kim; Kim Sang-joong - The Chaser as Kang Dong-yoon; Kim Soo-ro - A Gentleman's Dignity as Im Tae-san; Lee Beom-soo - History of a Salaryman as Yoo-bang; Lee Jong-hyuk - A Gentleman's Dignity as Lee Jung-rok; Lee Min-ho - Faith as Choi Young; So Ji-sub - Phantom as Kim Woo-hyun/Park Gi-young; Son Hyun-joo - The Chaser as Baek Hong-suk; Um Ki-joon - Phantom as Jo Hyun-min; Yoo Ah-in - Fashion King as Kang Young-gul	**Kim Ha-neul** - **A Gentleman's Dignity as Seo Yi-soo**; Chae Shi-ra - Five Fingers as Chae Yeong-rang; Han Ji-min - Rooftop Prince as Park-ha/Hong Bu-yong; Jang Shin-young - The Chaser as Shin Hye-ra; Jung Ryeo-won - History of a Salaryman as Baek Yeo-chi, The King of Dramas as Lee Go-eun; Kim Hee-sun - Faith as Yoo Eun-soo; Kim Jung-nan - A Gentleman's Dignity as Park Min-sook; Kwon Yuri - Fashion King as Choi Anna; Lee Yeon-hee - Phantom as Yoo Kang-mi; Shin Eun-kyung - Still You as Cha Soon-young; Shin Se-kyung - Fashion King as Lee Ga-young; Sulli - To the Beautiful You as Goo Jae-hee; Yoon Se-ah - A Gentleman's Dignity as Hong Se-ra; Yum Jung-ah - My Lover, Madame Butterfly as Nam Na-bi
Best Couple Award	Producer's Award
**Kim Min-jong** and **Yoon Jin-yi** - **A Gentleman's Dignity**; **Park Yoochun** and **Han Ji-min** - **Rooftop Prince**; Choi Minho and Sulli - To the Beautiful You; Jang Dong-gun and Kim Ha-neul - A Gentleman's Dignity; Jo Jae-yoon and Park Hyo-joo - The Chaser; Ju Ji-hoon and Jin Se-yeon - Five Fingers; Lee Beom-soo and Jung Ryeo-won - History of a Salaryman; Lee Jong-hyuk and Kim Jung-nan - A Gentleman's Dignity; Park Yong-woo and Yum Jung-ah - My Lover, Madame Butterfly; Ryu Seung-soo and Go Joon-hee - The Chaser; So Ji-sub and Kwak Do-won - Phantom; Yoo Ah-in and Shin Se-kyung - Fashion King	**Chae Shi-ra** - **Five Fingers as Chae Yeong-rang**; **Park Geun-hyung** - **The Chaser as Company President Seo**

=== Top 10 Stars ===
- Chae Shi-ra - Five Fingers
- Han Ji-min - Rooftop Prince
- Jang Dong-gun - A Gentleman's Dignity
- Jung Ryeo-won - History of a Salaryman, The King of Dramas
- Kim Ha-neul - A Gentleman's Dignity
- Lee Min-ho - Faith
- Park Yoochun - Rooftop Prince
- Shin Eun-kyung - Still You
- So Ji-sub - Phantom
- Son Hyun-joo - The Chaser

=== New Star Award ===
- Choi Minho - To the Beautiful You
- Go Joon-hee - The Chaser
- Jung Eun-woo - Five Fingers
- Kwon Yuri - Fashion King
- Lee Hyun-woo - To the Beautiful You
- Lee Jong-hyun - A Gentleman's Dignity
- Park Hyo-joo - The Chaser
- Park Se-young - Faith
- Sulli - To the Beautiful You
- Yoon Jin-yi - A Gentleman's Dignity
