= Mungyeong Jeon clan =

Korean clan from North Gyeongsang Province

- Country: Korea
- Current region: Mungyeong
- Founder: Jeon Yu gyeom
- Connected members: Jeon In-hwa

Mungyeong Jeon clan (Korean: 문경 전씨; Hanja: 聞慶 錢氏) is one of the Korean clans. Their Bon-gwan is in Mungyeong, North Gyeongsang Province. According to the research held in 2000, the number of Mungyeong Jeon clan’s member was 5535. Their founder was Jeon Yu gyeom who worked as Grand Secretariat of Long Tu Court (Hanja: 龍圖閣直學士) in Yuan dynasty. He entered Goryeo as a fatherly master of Princess Noguk who had a marriage to an ordinary person planned by Gongmin of Goryeo in 1351. He worked as Pingzhangshi (Hanja: 平章事) and married Ch'oe Yŏng’s sister. After that, he was settled in Kaesong and his government post reached to Jeongdang munhak (Hanja: 政堂文學). Then, his descendant founded Mungyeong Jeon clan and made Mungyeong, Mungyeong Jeon clan’s Bon-gwan.

== See also ==
- Korean clan names of foreign origin
