= An To-ch'i =

Assistant to King Gongmin

- Hangul: 안도치
- Hanja: 安都赤
- RR: An Dochi
- MR: An Toch'i

An To-ch'i (Korean: 안도치; Hanja: 安都赤; died April 15, 1363 (Note: In the Korean calendar (lunisolar), he died on 1 March 1363.)) was a Goryeo eunuch and an assistant of King Gongmin. After the King fled to Andong to escape the Red Turban invaders in 1361, he came back in March 3, 1363 after the situation was settled. King Gongmin decided to stay Heungwangsa Temple in Gyeonggi Province as the capital of Gaegyeong was devastated by the invasion. An was with the king at this time. On April 15, 1363, Kim Yong (김용; 金鏞) rebelled and attacked the Temple by sending about 50 men there to kill the king. An, a look-alike of the king, pretended to be his liege and was slain by the putschists. The king would survive the assassination and the perpetrators were punished.

== In popular culture ==
- Portrayed by Kim Dong-wan in the 1983 KBS TV series Foundation of the Kingdom.
- Portrayed by Lee Jung-sup in the 2005–2006 MBC TV series Shin Don.
- Portrayed by Kwon-min in the 2012 SBS TV series Faith.
