= Prince Deokheung =

Goryeo prince (fl. 14th century)

- Born: Wang Hye; Goryeo
- House: Wang
- Father: Chungseon of Goryeo
- Religion: Buddhism

Korean name
- Hangul: 왕혜
- Hanja: 王譓
- RR: Wang Hye
- MR: Wang Hye

Royal title
- Hangul: 덕흥군
- Hanja: 德興君
- RR: Deokheunggun
- MR: Tŏkhŭnggun

Prince Deokheung (Korean: 덕흥군; Hanja: 德興君), personal name Wang Hye (왕혜; 王譓) was the third son of Chungseon of Goryeo who became a Mongolian-backed pretender to the throne of Goryeo. After the ascension of King Gongmin, his half-nephew, to the throne of Goryeo, Prince Deokheung left Goryeo and settled in the Yuan capital of Dadu. Since then, he was also known by his Mongolian name, Tash Temür (塔思帖木兒) which spelled as Tapsacheopmoka (탑사첩목아) in Sino-Korean. At one point in his life, he was a Buddhist monk but he later returned to a secular life.

Yuan, under the influence of Empress Gi and her brother, Ki Ch'ŏl, attempted to dethrone Goryeo's king, Gongmin. Immediately after Gongmin executed Ki Ch'ŏl, the leader of the pro-Yuan Faction (친원파), his sister then deposed Gongmin and declared Wang Hye as the new King, with her nephew, Ki Sambono as the Crown Prince. In 1364, Wang led a force of 10,000 Yuan soldiers under the command of General Ch'oe Yu (최유; 崔濡) and attempted to invade Goryeo, but he failed in his objective to dethrone King Gongmin. After crossing Yalu River, his army was defeated by Goryeo forces led by Ch'oe Yŏng and Yi Sŏng-gye and Prince Deokheung was forced to retreat back to the Yuan Dynasty. Knowing this, the Yuan Emperor struck him with 107 Gonjang (곤장 107대) and then expelled them.

== In popular culture ==
- Portrayed by Heo Ki-ho in the 2005–2006 MBC TV Series Shin Don.
- Portrayed by Park Yoon-jae in the 2012 SBS TV series Faith.

== See also ==
- Chungseon of Goryeo
- Chungsuk of Goryeo
- Gongmin of Goryeo
