= Goryeosa =

Joseon-era historical book on Goryeo

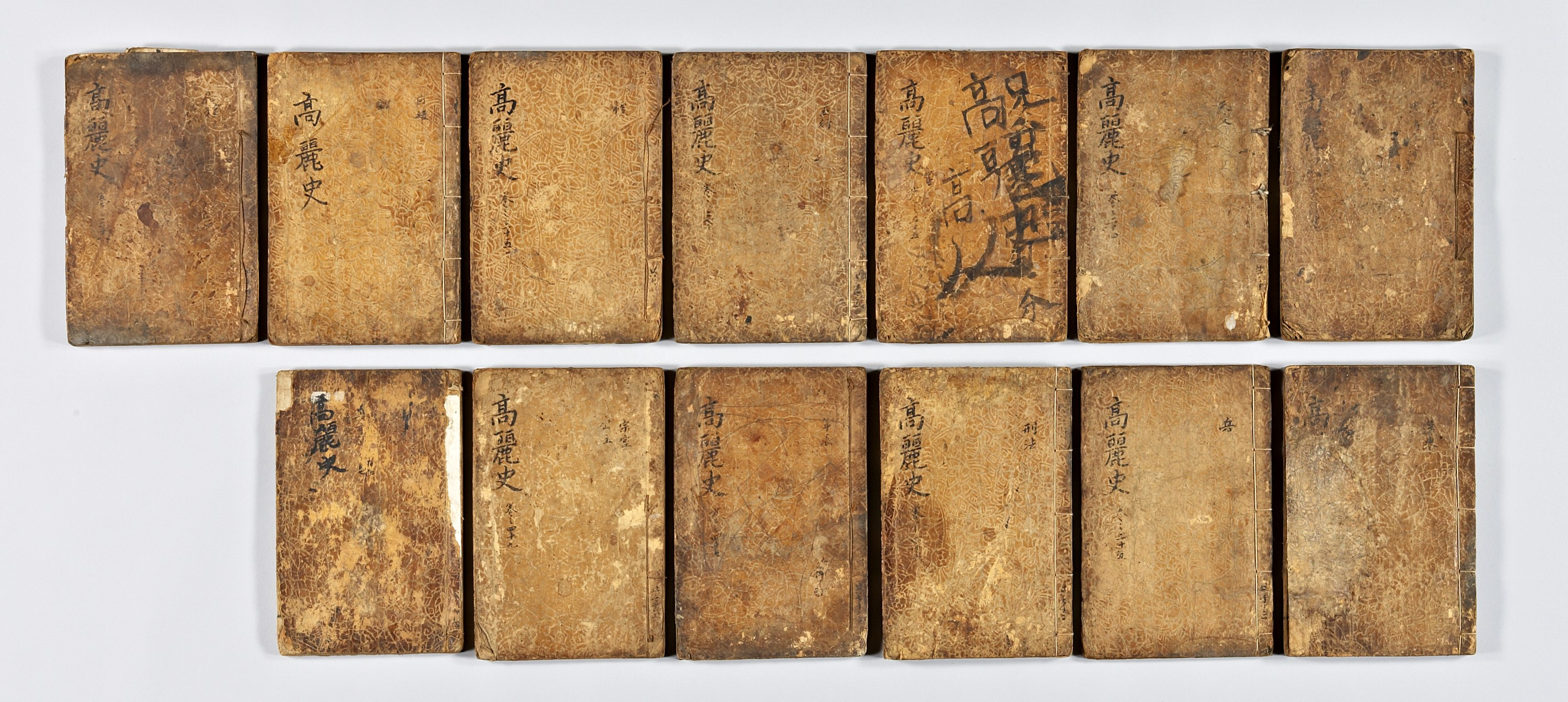
- Author: Chŏng Inji, Kim Chongsŏ, and others
- Original title: 高麗史
- Language: Classical Chinese
- Subject: History of Korea
- Genre: Ancient history
- Publication date: 1451
- Publication place: Joseon

Korean name
- Hangul: 고려사
- Hanja: 高麗史
- RR: Goryeosa
- MR: Koryŏsa

Goryeosa (Korean: 고려사; Hanja: 高麗史), or History of Goryeo, is an extensive historical record of the Goryeo dynasty, compiled by the officials of Goryeo's successor state, Joseon. Its compilation started during the reign of Taejo (the founding monarch of Joseon), was completed under Munjong, and was first printed under Danjong. Goryeosa consists of 137 volumes and stylistically follows Chinese historiography (기전체; 紀傳體) (cf. chronicle, 편년체; 編年體) where sections are organized by their purpose. The section compiling the annals of the kings, sega (세가; 世家) narrates the history of Goryeo kings. The monograph section, ji (지; 志), contains "accounts of the politics, economics, personnel (civil and military), geography, astronomy, and other topics related to Goryeo society." The biographies section, yeoljeon (열전; 列傳), describes notable officials. The chronology section, yeonpyo (연표; 年表) lists the names of kings and their reigns. The listing section, mongnok (목록; 目錄), is the table of contents of the entire compilation.

In 1452, a year after the completion of Goryeosa compilation, Kim Chongsŏ and 27 other historians authored a 35-volume complementary summary of Goryeosa, Goryeosajeolyo (Essentials of Goryeo History). Goryeosajeolyo is written in chronological order, deviating from Chinese historiography that divides sections into important subjects (e.g., kings, traitors, notable officials, chronology, and monographs) and thus is prone to duplicate recording of the same event.

The entire Goryeosa, in its original and in modern Korean translation, is currently available online by courtesy of the National Institute of Korean History. A translation to English was published in 2024.

== Compilation ==
Immediately after the founding of Joseon, the compilation of Goryeo history began, a process that spanned 60 years until its completion in 1451. The first historiographical attempt at Goryeo history, Goryeoguksa (고려국사; 高麗國史), was led by Chŏng Tojŏn and completed in 1396. However, following Chŏng's death during the First Strife of the Princes, Chŏng's chronicle, Goryeoguksa, faced criticism and controversy for its alleged misrepresentation of Goryeo history. This led to several rounds of revision, years into Sejong's reign. Sejong in particular criticized Goryeoguksa that Chŏng Tojŏn introduced personal biases into the chronicle, especially about his political rival, Chŏng Mong-ju, and suggested the chronicle was not even worth preserving.

In 1418, the year of Sejong's coronation, Sejong ordered the revision of Goryeoguksa. He believed that the chronicles of Goryeo history from Taejo's reign had errors and omissions, especially regarding the details and accounts of the periods around the rise and fall of the Goryeo dynasty. Meanwhile, historians were split over whether to preserve the imperial language used in the Kingdom of Goryeo or to revise it, aligning with Confucian principles, to that of a tributary state. (Note: Goryeo practiced naeje woewang (내제외왕; 內帝外王), meaning emperor at home, king abroad. Goryeo kings used jong (종; 宗), reserved for emperors, as temple names; they referred to themselves as jim (짐; 朕), the appellation of an emperor; subjects were to address the king pyeha (폐하; 陛下) instead of jeonha (전하; 殿下), and the crown prince was styled taeja (태자; 太子) instead of seja (세자; 世子). It is commonly seen in Korean period pieces set in the Joseon dynasty in which Joseon kings use the imperial jim (짐; 朕) to refer to themselves; however, this is mostly artistic license, because Joseon kings for the most part used yeo (여; 余) or gwa'in (과인; 寡人).) Sejong was in favor of being truthful to historical facts and ordered the historians not to alter Goryeo lexicon (i.e., 이실직서; 以實直書). Goryeosajeonmun (고려사전문; 高麗史全文), completed in 1442, was the first to result from Sejong's order; however, it became known that Kwŏn Che, the chief scholar-official responsible for the revision, had tampered with records of his ancestors, especially those of Kwŏn Sup'yŏng. Sejong ordered a revision and required that the revised edition be in the format established by Sima Qian's Records of the Grand Historian. Sejong also believed the historians portrayed Goryeo unfairly in order to further legitimize the founding of the Joseon dynasty. Sejong died a year before the completion of Goryeosa. Since Sejong did not see the completed Goryeosa, it is unknown whether he would have been content with the work; nevertheless, the compilation project ended in 1451, the year of Munjong's coronation.

None of Goryeosa's predecessors are available today, except their forewords that are recorded in the Veritable Records of the Joseon Dynasty.

== Editions ==
Goryeosa was first printed in 1454, the second year of Danjong's reign, and widely distributed, but this initial edition did not survive. A remarkably well-preserved complete edition, currently housed in the Seokdang Museum of Dong-a University, is a woodblock-printed replica dating to 1613. It is based on an earlier edition estimated to have been printed in 1482, using 42 metal movable type blocks known as Eulhae-ja (을해자; 乙亥字). In 2010, Busan designated the 1613 edition as tangible cultural heritage (유형문화유산). Another surviving partial edition, housed in the Baeknyeon Buddhist Temple in Nam-gu, Busan, was designated as a cultural heritage material (문화유산자료) in 2014. Several other editions have survived and are dispersed worldwide, including the one held in Collège de France and another in Cambridge University Library.

The modern Korean translation of Goryeosa began in 2001 under the auspices of the National Research Foundation of Korea by the Seokdang Academy of Dong-a University. In 2009, the National Institute of Korean History began providing the gujeom (verbatim) edition (구점본; 句點本), making it accessible online with original images from Kyujanggak. The website expanded in 2010 to include the pyojeom (annotated) edition (표점본; 標點本), which incorporates sentence punctuation, index tags (personal names, place names, titles, official positions), and article titles. During the final phase between 2014 and 2015, the website began offering a modern Korean translation of Goryeosa.

== Evaluation and Influences ==
Because Goryeosa was written by the scholar-officials of Goryeo's successor state, Joseon, whose founding monarch deposed King U and assassinated both King U and King Chang, the historians who authored Goryeosa worked intently on creating a narrative arc that legitimized the founding of Joseon. As a result, King U and King Chang were taken out of the annals of kings (sega), put in as biographies (yeoljeon), and were treated as false kings with dubious lineage. According to Goryeosa, King U and King Chang were descended, not from the royal Wang family, but from Buddhist monk Sin Ton. The narrative of Goryeosa depicts early Goryeo as an era of good governance followed by turmoils toward late Goryeo and thus deserving of its overthrow to stabilize the society, as shown in the foreword of Goryeosa:

But later kings lost their way and powerful subjects did as they pleased, raising their own armies to lust after the throne. This began during the reign of King Injong 仁宗 (r. 1122–1146), when the ruler's power was first contested, and it worsened in the reign of King Ŭijong 毅宗 (r. 1146–1170). After that, heinous traitors cloaked as subjects rose one after another to feign kingship and were removed like pieces in a game of go (paduk) or chess (changgi). Savage foreign enemies invaded repeatedly, cutting the people down like grass. In this hard time, it fell to King Wŏnjong 元宗 (r. 1259–1274) to quell a large rebellion, preserving, albeit barely, the great calling of our ancestors. King Ch'ungnyŏl 忠烈 (r. 1274–1308) then frittered his time away playing games and banqueting with his sycophants, causing a breach in his relations with his son (Ch'ungsŏn 忠宣, r. 1298, r. 1308–1313). Repeated misfortunes occurred during the reign of King Ch'ungsuk 忠肅 (r. 1313–1330, r. 1332–1339) and after, slowly depleting the country until the reign of King Kongmin 恭愍 (r. 1351–1374). Then, with the false kings, the country's very foundation fell into the utmost danger. At that hour, the fate of Goryeo passed to its true ruler.

— Foreword of Goryeosa, Koryŏsa: the history of Koryŏ, annals of the kings (2024, p. 16)

Despite the self-serving narrative, particularly regarding late Goryeo society, it provides insight into early Joseon's official stance on the Goryeo dynasty.

Another source of bias was neo-Confucianism that started dominating Joseon literati society, although Buddhism continued to have influence in Joseon society well into the mid-1400s. Joseon society's views on family relationships differed from those of Goryeo society. For example, incest was commonplace, and even preferred, among Goryeo's royal family, because marrying non-royals was seen as damaging to the bloodline. Additionally, while both Goryeo and Joseon practiced polygyny, Goryeo's polygyny involved multiple wives of equal status, whereas Joseon's consisted of one wife and many concubines. As a result, Goryeosa portrays certain Goryeo kings who did not fit into Joseon literati's neo-Confucian values in a negative light.

Despite the biases, Goryeosa is generally considered truthful to the original historical sources, and its writing maintains a matter-of-fact tone without embellishments. King Sejong in particular made efforts to shield Goryeosa from political biases. For example, he instructed the historians not to omit or alter historical facts to promote Confucian ideals or to please the new dynasty. As a result, Chŏng Mong-ju and Kim Jin-yang remained loyal to Goryeo until the end and opposed Yi Sŏng-gye, yet they are recorded in Goryeosa as loyal honorable subjects. Goryeosa omits accounts of named Buddhist monks of the Goryeo dynasty.

== See also ==
- Tongguk t'onggam
- Samguk sagi
- Veritable Records of the Joseon Dynasty
- History of Korea
