= Taewon An clan =

Korean clan originating in Shanxi, China

- Country: Korea
- Current region: Shanxi
- Founder: An Man se

Taewon An clan (Korean: 태원 안씨; Hanja: 太原 安氏) was one of the known Korean clans in history. Their Bon-gwan was in Shanxi, China. According to a research in 2000, Taewon An clan was founded in 1396 by a man named An Man se. He was from Taiyuan and served as a bureaucrat in the Yuan dynasty. He entered Goryeo as a fatherly master of Princess Noguk, an Imperial princess who married a commoner. Later, he served as Minister of Rites and began the Taewon An clan. Taiyuan was his hometown.

== See also ==
- Korean clan names of foreign origin
