= U of Goryeo =

King of Goryeo from 1374 to 1388

U 우 禑
- Grand Prince of the Gangnyeong Mansion (강녕부원대군; 江寧府院大君)

King of Goryeo
- Reign: 1374–1388
- Coronation: 1374
- Predecessor: Gongmin of Goryeo
- Successor: Chang of Goryeo
- Born: Wang U (Monino); 25 July 1365; Gaegyeong-bu, Goryeo
- Died: 31 December 1389 (aged 24); Gangneung-bu, Gyojugangneung-do, Goryeo
- Consort: Royal Consort Geun (m. 1379)
- Issue: Chang of Goryeo
Names
- Sin U / Shin Woo (신우; 辛禑)
Regnal name
- King Yeo of Heung (여흥왕; 驪興王); King of Before Deposed (전폐왕; 前廢王)
- House: Wang
- Father: Gongmin of Goryeo
- Mother: Banya (birth mother); Queen Sunjeong (legal)
- Religion: Buddhism

- U of Goryeo
- Hangul: 우왕
- Hanja: 禑王
- Revised Romanization: U-wang
- McCune–Reischauer: U-wang

Childhood name
- Hangul: 모니노
- Hanja: 牟尼奴
- Revised Romanization: Monino
- McCune–Reischauer: Monino

U (25 July 1365 – 31 December 1389) ruled Goryeo (Korea) as the 32nd king from 1374 until 1388. He was the only son of King Gongmin.

== Cultural background ==
In the thirteenth century, Mongol forces had invaded China and established the Yuan dynasty in 1271. After a series of Mongol invasions, Goryeo eventually capitulated and entered into a peace treaty with the Yuan dynasty, in which Goryeo was subordinate tributary state to Mongol Empire. The Ming dynasty in China had grown extremely powerful during the 14th century, however, and it began to beat back the Yuan forces, so that by the 1350s Goryeo had managed to regain its northern territories and took back the Liaodong region.

== Birth ==
According to the records, U was reportedly born to slave girl Banya, a maid of the monk Shin Don, and King Gongmin. Because Gongmin initially denied the child as his son and refused to name him, Shin Don took it upon himself and named the boy Monino (meaning "servant of Buddha"). As a result of the King's refusal to recognize the child, intense debate and speculation surrounding the lineage of the boy ensued and Monino was not permitted to enter or live inside the palace.

Soon after the death of Shin Don in 1371, King Gongmin summoned Monino to the palace to formally recognize and proclaim the boy as his son and sole heir to the throne. Gongmin officially pronounced Monino to the Royal Court as Crown Prince and renamed him "U", recording his mother to be a deceased palace maid of the Han clan.

== Accession to the throne ==
In 1374, a high official named Yi In-im led a small but powerful, anti-Ming faction that assassinated King Gongmin.

The anti-Ming group enthroned the eleven-year-old boy, as King Gongmin's successor. Suspicious about Gongmin's sudden and unexplained death, the Chinese doubted the legitimacy of the adolescent King U.

A few years after his enthronement in 1376, King U's birth mother Banya snuck into the residence of Queen Mother Myeongdeok to protest the fact that she was not acknowledged as the king's mother. Banya was sentenced to imprisonment and later thrown into the Imjin River where she drowned.

== Diplomatic tensions with China ==
King U's reign was characterised by the political fallout of the demise of the Yuan dynasty and rise of the Ming, with his court divided into pro- and anti-Ming groups. King U was put on the throne by the pro-Yuan official Yi In-Im, and the influence of the latter caused substantial conflict over whether to restore relations with the Yuan or strengthen existing relations with the Ming.

Tensions over this crucial foreign policy protocol had not been resolved when the Ming Dynasty proclaimed its intention to establish a command post headquartered in the Ch'ollyŏng pass at the southern end of the Hamgyŏng Plain in 1388.

Pro-Yuan officials apparently succeeding in persuading the king to take action against the Ming, as he ordered General Yi Seonggye to conquer Yodong in Ming territory. Goryeo's senior military commander, General Ch'oe Yŏng, consulted with General Yi Seong-gye, and determined that removal of the anti-Ming faction from power in Kaesŏng was essential to reducing the perceived threat from Ming China. Supported by Seong-gye, Choi removed Yi In-Im and his group accordingly in a coup d'état and took personal control of the government.

== Fall and death ==
There was a growing feeling in Kaesŏng that Goryeo needed to take some kind of preemptive action against China, and advisors to King U eventually goaded him into attacking the powerful Ming armies. Against universal opposition, and in violation of the long-standing Goryeo practice of not invading its neighbors, King U went one step further and insisted on attacking China proper.

In 1388, General Yi Seong-gye was ordered to use his armies to push the Ming armies out of the Korean peninsula. Upon reaching the Amrok River and realizing that the strength of the Ming forces surmounted the forces of Goryeo, he decided to return to the capital and take control of Goryeo's government instead of destroying his army by attacking the Ming.

Returning to Kaesŏng and, after overpowering the royal court's defenders and removing (then killing) General Ch'oe Yŏng, Yi Seong-gye usurped the throne from Goryeo's Dynasty and took control of the government. King U was deposed and replaced with his son, King Chang; together they were assassinated with poison one year later and replaced with Prince Gongyang on the grounds that he was of true royal descent.

King U is the only king in Goryeo's long history to never receive a posthumous title for his reign.

== Family ==
- Father: Gongmin of Goryeo
  - Grandfather: Chungsuk of Goryeo
  - Grandmother: Queen Gongwon of the Namyang Hong clan
- Mother:
  - Biological: Banya
  - Adoptive: Queen Sunjeong of the Goksan Han clan
    - Grandfather: Han Jun
    - Grandmother: Lady, of the Han clan (한씨)
- Consort(s) and their respective issue:
1. Consort Geun of the Goseong Yi clan
  1. Crown Prince Wang Chang, first son
2. Consort Yeong of the Dongju Choe clan
3. Consort Ui of the Jangyeon No clan, personal name Seok-bi
4. Consort Suk of the Choe clan, personal name Yong-deok
5. Consort An of the Kang clan
6. Consort Jeong of the Pyongsan Shin clan
7. Consort Deok of the Jo clan, personal name Bong-ga-yi
8. Consort Seon of the Kaesong Wang clan
9. Consort Hyeon of the Juksan An clan
10. Princess Hwasun, personal name So-mae-hyang (소매향)
11. Princess Myeongsun, personal name Yeon-ssang-bi (연쌍비)
12. Princess Yeongseon, personal name Chil-jeom-seon (칠점선)

== In popular culture ==
- Portrayed by Lee Doo-seop in the 1983 KBS TV series Foundation of the Kingdom.
- Portrayed by Bang Hoon in the 1983 MBC TV series The King of Chudong Palace.
- Portrayed by Kwon Oh-seong in the 1996–1998 KBS TV series Tears of the Dragon.
- Portrayed by Choi Soo-han in the 2005–2006 MBC TV series Shin Don.
- Portrayed by Lee Tae-ri and Jung Joon-won in the 2012–2013 SBS TV series The Great Seer.
- Portrayed by Park Jin-woo and Jung Yun-seok in the 2014 KBS TV series Jeong Do-jeon.
- Portrayed by Lee Hyeon-bae in the 2015–2016 SBS TV series Six Flying Dragons.
- Portrayed by Im Ji-kyu in the 2021–2022 KBS1 TV series The King of Tears, Lee Bang-won

== See also ==
- Chŏng Mong-ju
- List of Korean monarchs

U of Goryeo House of Wang Born: 25 July 1365 Died: 31 December 1389
Regnal titles
| Preceded by Gongmin | King of Goryeo; 1374–1388 | Succeeded by Chang |
