= Gaeguk =

Gaeguk may refer to:

- Foundation of the Kingdom, 1983 South Korean TV series

== Historical eras ==
- Gaeguk (551–568), era name used by Jinheung of Silla
- Gaeguk (1894–1895), era name used by Gojong of Korea
