= Shinbi Yeom =

Goryeo queen consort (fl. 14th century)

Royal Consort Shin-Bi of the Paju Yeom clan 신비 염씨

Royal Consort of Goryeo
- Tenure: 1371–1374
- Coronation: 1371
- Predecessor: Royal Consort Jeong
- Successor: Palace Lady Han
- Born: 1350; Goryeo
- Died: Unknown
- Spouse: Gongmin of Goryeo (m. 1371; died 1374)
- House: Paju Yeom (by birth); House of Wang (by marriage)
- Father: Yeom Je-sin, Internal Prince Gokseong
- Mother: Grand Lady of Jinhan State of the Andong Gwon clan

- Shinbi Yeom
- Hangul: 신비 염씨
- Hanja: 愼妃 廉氏
- RR: Sinbi Yeomssi
- MR: Sinbi Yŏmssi

Royal Consort Shin of the Paju Yeom clan (Korean: 신비 염씨; Hanja: 愼妃 廉氏; 1350 – ?) was the 6th wife of King Gongmin of Goryeo.

== Biography ==
=== Early life and family ===
Lady Yeom was born in 1350 as the youngest daughter of Yeom Je-shin and Lady Gwon of the Andong Gwon clan. Lady Yeom was the 11th child and 6th daughter of 11 siblings.

Her maternal aunt became the sister-in-law to Queen Sindeok, the second wife of King Taejo, through her marriage with the Queen’s older brother, Kang Sun-ryong.

Through her third older brother, Yeom Jeong-su, Lady Yeom became the great-great-grandaunt to Queen Ansun, the wife of King Yejong.

=== Marriage and palace life ===
On 28 November 1371 (20th year reign of King Gongmin of Goryeo), she was honoured as Royal Consort Shin (신비; 愼妃). As they didn't have any issue, in 1372 (21st year of King Gongmin), he selected some young and handsome men and then ordered Han Ahn (한안) and Hong Ryun (홍륜) from the Self-Defense Committee to have sex with his consorts. After King Gongmin was assassinated in 1374, Yeom chose to leave the Palace, shaved her hair and became a Buddhist monk. Even so, the court still respected all of the late King Gongmin's widowed consorts and continued to provide their daily necessities until it was stopped in 1388. After this, there are no records left about Yeom's life.

== Family ==
- Father - Yeom Je-shin (염제신; 廉悌臣; 1304–1382)
- Mother - Grand Lady Jinhan of the Andong Gwon clan (진한국대부인 안동 권씨; 1302 – ?); third daughter of Gwon Han-gong (권한공, 權漢功; 1265–1349)
- Older brother - Yeom Guk-bo, Prince Seoseong (염국보 서성군; 廉國寶 瑞城君; 1325 – ?)
- Older brother - Yeom Gwang-won (염광원; 廉廣元; 1327 – ?)
- Older sister - Lady Yeom (염씨; 1332–1396)
- Older sister - Lady Yeom (염씨; 1334 – ?)
- Older brother - Yeom Jeong-su (염정수; 廉廷秀; 1342–1388)
- Older brother - Yeom Hye-ju (염혜주; 廉惠珠; 1344 – ?)
- Older brother - Yeom Heung-bang (염흥방; 廉興邦; 1346–1388)
- Older sister - Lady Yeom (염씨; 1346 – ?); Byeon Nam-Yong’s first wife
- Older sister - Lady Yeom (염씨; 1348–1376); first wife of Jeong Hui-gye
- Older sister - Lady Yeom (염씨; 1350 – ?)

Ancestors of Shinbi Yeom

Yeom Seung-ik 염승익
Yeom Se-chung 염세충
Yeom Je-sin, Internal Prince Gokseong 염제신 곡성부원군
Cho In-gyu, Lord of Pyongyang 조인규 평양부원군
Princess Gasun of the Pyongyang Cho clan 가순택주 평양 조씨
Royal Consort Sin-Bi Yeom 신비 염씨
Mr. Gwon 권씨
Gwon Han-gong, Internal Prince Yecheon 권한공 예천부원군
Grand Lady of Jinhan State of the Andong Gwon clan 진한국대부인 안동 권씨

== In popular culture ==
- Portrayed by Uhm Hye-Shin in the 2014 KBS TV series Jeong Do-jeon.
