= Banya (Goryeo) =

Biological mother of King U of Goryeo

Banya 반야 般若
- Born: 1345
- Died: 1376 (aged 31); Imjin River, Goryeo
- Issue: U of Goryeo

Banya (Korean: 반야; Hanja: 般若; 1345 – 1376 (Note: According to the Korean calendar (lunisolar), she died in the 3rd month of 1376.)) was the biological mother of King U of Goryeo. She was thrown into the Imjin River by Queen Dowager Myeongdeok after she complained of injustice and insisted that the king was her biological son.

== Biography ==
Banya was a slave of the Buddhist monk Sin Don. King Gongmin visited Sin Don often, and in the course of these visits he slept with Banya. She gave birth to a son in 1365. The Goryeosa, compiled during the Joseon period, states that Banya was a servant-turned-concubine of Sin Don and that the child was actually Sin Don's son. However, the veracity of these claims was questioned even in the Joseon period, and it is generally accepted that the boy, known by the childhood name Monino (모니노; 牟尼奴), was indeed King Gongmin's son.

The Goryeosa records that King Gongmin banished Sin Don to Suwon in 1371, after which he named his son by Banya his heir. The boy was renamed U and recorded to be the king's son by a deceased palace maid of the Han clan. When Gongmin died in 1374, the boy became King U.

In 1376, Banya snuck into the residence of Queen Dowager Myeongdeok, where she complained, "I gave birth to the king, so how is it that his mother is of the Han clan?" The Queen Dowager drove Banya out, and she was sentenced to imprisonment. At her sentencing, Banya pointed to the inner gate and shouted, "If heaven knows of my resentment, this gate will surely collapse!" The gate then promptly collapsed, just as an official was about to walk through it. Despite this, Banya was thrown into the Imjin River, and one of her relatives was executed.

== In popular culture ==
- Portrayed by Geum Bo-ra in the 1983 KBS1 TV series Foundation of the Kingdom.
- Portrayed by Jeon Ha-eun, Bang Joon-seo, and Seo Ji-hye in the 2005 MBC TV series Sin Don.
- Portrayed by Park Min-ji and Lee Yoon-ji in the 2012 SBS TV series The Great Seer.
