= Chang of Goryeo =

King of Goryeo from 1388 to 1389

Chang 창 昌

King of Goryeo
- Reign: 1388–1389
- Coronation: 1388
- Predecessor: U of Goryeo
- Successor: Gongyang of Goryeo
- Born: Wang Chang; 6 September 1380; Gaegyeong, Goryeo
- Died: 31 December 1389 (aged 9); Ganghwa-do, Goryeo
- House: Wang
- Father: U of Goryeo
- Mother: Royal Consort Geun of the Goseong Yi clan
- Religion: Buddhism

- Chang of Goryeo
- Hangul: 왕창
- Hanja: 王昌
- RR: Wang Chang
- MR: Wang Ch'ang

Monarch name
- Hangul: 창왕
- Hanja: 昌王
- RR: Changwang
- MR: Ch'angwang

Chang (6 September 1380 – 31 December 1389) was the 33rd and youngest ruler of the Goryeo Dynasty of Korea. His life and death is often compared with Grand Prince Yeongchang.

== Biography ==
Prince Chang Sung Woo was the only son of King U and Royal Consort Geun of the Goseong Yi clan, daughter of Yi Rim. King U was forced from power after Yi Sŏnggye mutinied in 1388, and King Chang was put on the throne in his stead.

During his reign from June 1388 to November 1389, Chang experienced a great chaos of reforms. There were two factions: one wanted a conservative reform, and the other wanted a radical reform. The former was led by Cho Min-su (曺敏修), and Yi Saek, and the latter was led by Yi Sŏnggye, and Chŏng Tojŏn. King Chang tried to arbitrate the two fractions. However, as Yi Saek lost his political power following the impeachment of Yi Sung-in, King Chang lost his authority, making Yi Sŏnggye the most powerful man in Goryeo.

In November 1389, there was a rumor that former King U tried to assassinate Yi Sŏnggye. This provided the reason for abdication of King Chang.

King Chang was assassinated, together with his father, shortly after the ascension of Gongyang, whilst in exile. King Chang was 9 years of age.

== Family ==
- Father: U of Goryeo
  - Grandfather: Gongmin of Goryeo
  - Grandmother:
    - Biological: Lady Ban-Ya
    - Adoptive: Queen Sunjeong of the Goksan Han clan
- Mother: Royal Consort Geun of the Goseong Yi clan
  - Grandfather: Yi Rim
  - Grandmother: Lady of Byeonhan State of the Hong clan (변한국부인 홍씨)

== In popular culture ==
- Portrayed by Kim A-reum in the 1983 KBS1 TV series Foundation of the Kingdom.
- Portrayed by Jeon Hyeon in the 1983 MBC TV series The King of Chudong Palace.
- Portrayed by Yun Dong-won in the 1996–1998 KBS TV series Tears of the Dragon.
- Portrayed by Kim Jun-seong in the 2014 KBS TV series Jeong Do-jeon.
- Portrayed by Hwang Jae-won in the 2015–2016 SBS TV series Six Flying Dragons.

== See also ==
- List of monarchs of Korea
- Goryeo

Chang of Goryeo House of Wang Born: 6 September 1381 Died: 31 December 1389
Regnal titles
| Preceded by King U | King of Goryeo; 1388–1389 | Succeeded by King Gongyang |
