= Son Chang-min =

South Korean actor (born 1965)

- Born: April 24, 1965 (age 61); Busan, South Korea
- Education: Chung-Ang University; Chung-Ang University - Graduate School of Mass Communication (Broadcasting)
- Occupation: Actor
- Years active: 1971–present
- Agent: Blossom Entertainment
- Spouse: Unknown (m. 1992)
- Children: 1

Korean name
- Hangul: 손창민
- Hanja: 孫暢敏
- RR: Son Changmin
- MR: Son Ch'angmin

Son Chang-min (Korean: 손창민; born April 24, 1965) is a South Korean actor.

== Filmography ==
=== Television ===
- Vengeance of the Bride (태풍의 신부/ 2022)
- Rookie Cops (너와 나의 경찰수업 / 2022)
- My Sassy Girl (엽기적인 그녀/ 2017)
- Band of Sisters (언니는 살아있다 / 2017)
- My Daughter, Geum Sa-wol (내 딸, 금사월 / 2015)
- Unkind Ladies (착하지 않은 여자들 / 2015)
- Pride and Prejudice (오만과 편견/ 2014)
- Glorious Day (기분 좋은날/ 2014)
- Princess Aurora (오로라 공주/ 2013)
- Heartless City (무정도시/ 2013)
- The King's Doctor (마의/ 2012)
- Glory Jane (영광의 재인/ 2011)
- Stormy Lovers (폭풍의 연인/ 2010)
- Road No. 1 (로드 넘버원/ 2010)
- Woman of Matchless Beauty, Park Jung-geum (천하일색 박정금/ 2008)
- Kid Gang (키드갱/ 2007)
- Shin Don (신돈/ 2005)
- Bad Housewife (불량주부/ 2005)
- My Fair Lady (요조숙녀/ 2003)
- Kuk Hee (국희/ 1999)
- Roses and Beansprouts (장미와 콩나 / 1999)
- Advocate (애드버킷 / 1998)
- Memories (추억/ 1998)
- Heart of Lies (마음이 고와야지/ 1998)
- Three Women (세여자/1997)
- Revenge and Passion (복수혈전,/ 1997)
- The Reason I Live (내가 사는 이유, / 1997)
- Medical Brothers (의가형제, / 1997)
- In The Name of Love (사랑의 이름으로1996)
- Sons of the Wind (바람의 아들/ 1995)
- Love and Marriage (사랑과 결혼/ 1995)
- Farewell (작별/ 1994)
- Wild Chrysanthemum (들국화/1993)
- Roses and Sprouts (장미와 콩나물/1993)
- City People (도시인/ 1991)
- 3 Day Promise (3일의 약속/1991)
- Autumn Flowers in Winter Trees (가을꽃 겨울나무/ 1991)
- Freezing Point (빙점/1990)
- Winter Traveler (겨울 나그네/1990)
- The Face of a City (도시의 얼굴/ 1989)
- A Tree Blooming with Love (사랑이 꽃피는 나무/ 1987)
- The People I Love (사랑하는 사람들/ 1984)
- Diary of a High School Student (고교생일기/ 1983)
- I Regret It (후회합니다/ 1977)

=== Film ===
- The Weird Missing Case of Mr. J (정승필 실종사건, 2009)
- Bank Attack (마을금고 연쇄습격사건, 2007) (cameo)
- The Mafia, the Salesman (상사부일체, 2007)
- A Wacky Switch (나도야 간다, 2004)
- Father and Son: The Story of Mencius (맹부삼천지교, 2004)
- T.R.Y. (トライ, 트라이, 2003)
- Jungle Juice (정글주스, 2001)
- Firebird (불새, 1997)
- Father vs. Son (박대박, 1997)
- A Heavy Bird (무거운 새, 1994)
- Sudden Change (아주 특별한 변신, 1994)
- Woman for Love, Woman for Marriage (사랑하고 싶은 여자, 결혼하고 싶은 여자, 1993)
- Silver Stallion (은마는 오지 않는다, 1991)
- Camels Don't Cry Alone (낙타는 따로 울지 않는다, 1991)
- All That Falls Has Wings (추락하는 것은 날개가 있다, 1990)
- Gagman (개그맨, 1988)
- Whale Hunting, Part 2 (고래 사냥 2, 1985)
- My Love Jjang-gu (내 사랑 짱구, 1985)
- There Must Be Mother, Somewhere (어딘가에 엄마가, 1978)
- Flower Shoes (꽃신, 1978)
- Blood Relations (핏줄, 1976)
- Mother and Son (어머니와 아들, 1976)
- Mr. Bull (소띠 아저씨, 1974)
- An Inmate (동거인, 1974)
- Unforgettable Mother's Love (잊지 못할 모정, 1974)
- Orders for Assassination (암살지령, 1974)
- Wrath of an Angel (천사의 분노, 1973)
- Mom's Wedding (엄마결혼식, 1973)
- A Family with Many Daughters (딸부자집, 1973)
- Two Sons Crying for Their Mother's Love (모정에 우는 두아들, 1972)
- Looking for Sons and Daughters (아들 딸 찾아 천리길, 1972)
- The Wedding Ring (결혼반지, 1972)
- Ahn Jung-geun, the Patriot (의사 안중근, 1972)
- Spring, Summer, Autumn, and Winter (봄, 여름, 가을 그리고 겨울, 1971)

== Awards ==
- 2017 SBS Drama Awards: Top Excellence Award, Actor in a Daily/Weekend Drama (Band of Sisters)
- 2005 MBC Drama Awards: Special Acting Award (Shin Don)
- 2005 SBS Drama Awards: Excellence Award, Actor in a Drama Special (Bad Housewife)
- 1999 MBC Drama Awards: Top Excellence Award, Actor (Roses and Beansprouts)
- 1999 12th Grimae Awards: Best Actor (Kuk Hee)
- 1998 MBC Drama Awards: Top Excellence Award, Actor (Advocate)
- 1992 Eserciti-e-Popoli Film Festival: Best Actor (Silver Stallion)
- 1990 26th Baeksang Arts Awards: Most Popular Actor (Film) (All That Falls Has Wings)
- 1986 KBS Drama Awards: Excellence Award, Actor
- 1985 21st Baeksang Arts Awards: Best New Actor (TV) (Diary of a College Student, The People I Love)
- 1971 10th Grand Bell Awards: Best Child Actor
