= Geunbi Yi =

Queen consort of Goryeo (fl. 14th century)

Royal Consort Geun 근비

Queen consort of Goryeo
- Tenure: 1379–1388
- Coronation: 1379
- Predecessor: Queen Indeok
- Successor: Queen Consort No
- Born: 1365; Goseong, Goryeo
- Died: Unknown
- Spouse: U of Goryeo (m. 1379–1389)
- Issue: Chang of Goryeo
- House: Goseong Yi (by birth); House of Wang (by marriage)
- Father: Yi Rim
- Mother: Lady Hong of the Namyang Hong clan
- Religion: Buddhism

Royal Consort Geun of the Goseong Yi clan (Korean: 근비 이씨; Hanja: 謹妃 李氏; 1365 (Note: In the Korean calendar (lunisolar), the Queen was born on 12 December 1364) – ?) was a Korean royal consort as the first wife of King U and the mother of his successor, King Chang. She was the fourth Goryeo queen who didn't receive a posthumous name like the other consorts following Lady Yun.

== Biography ==
=== Early life ===
The future Royal Consort Geun was born in 1365 into the Goseong Yi clan in Goseong County as the daughter of Yi Rim (이림), who was a relative of Yi In-im (이인임), and Lady Hong of the Namyang Hong clan.

=== Marriage and palace life ===
In 1379, she became the consort of the 13-year-old U of Goryeo and given title as Consort Geun (근비; 謹妃), also lived in Hudeok Mansion (후덕부; 厚德府). Following this, Yi Rim was honoured as "Internal Prince Cheolseong" (철성부원군; 鐵城府院君) and his wife became "Lady of Byeonhan State" (변한국부인; 卞韓國夫人) alongside his mother became "Grand Lady of Samhan State" (삼한국대부인; 三韓國大夫人). Two felons were released from prison to mark the occasion. In September 1380, she gave birth to a prince (the future King Chang) and one felon was released to celebrate it.

=== After King U's deposal ===
In 1388, after ordering an attack on Liaodong in Ming territory, King U was forced to abdicate during a coup led by the general Yi Seong-gye. His only young son ascended the throne as King Chang with Yi Seong-gye as the regent, then Royal Consort Geun was promoted to Grand Royal Consort (왕대비). All of the former king's other consorts were forced to leave the palace and return to their natal homes.

Little more than a year later, both King U and King Chang were demoted to commoner status with the justification that U had not actually been the son of his royal father, and Wang Yo was enthroned as the new ruler–King Gongyang. In addition to her husband and son, Royal Consort Geun's father and brother were exiled, as well as two of her brothers-in-law, a nephew-in-law, and a nephew. Late in 1389, the two former kings were killed, and Royal Consort Geun's father was imprisoned in Cheongju.

== Family ==
- Father: Yi Rim (이림, 李琳; 1330–1391)
- Mother: Grand Lady of Byeon State of the Namyang Hong clan (변한국부인 남양 홍씨, 卞韓國夫人 南陽 洪氏; 1329–?)
- Sibling(s)
  - Older sister: Lady Yi (이씨; 李氏)
  - Older brother: Yi Gwi-saeng (이귀생; 李貴生; 1352 – ?)
  - Older brother: Yi Mu-saeng (이무생; 李茂生; 1354 – ?)
  - Older sister: Lady Yi (이씨; 李氏; 1342 – ?)
  - Younger sister: Lady Yi (이씨; 李氏; 1367 – ?)
- Husband: Wang U, King U of Goryeo (고려 우왕; 1365–1389)
  - Son: Wang Chang, King Chang of Goryeo (고려 창왕; 1380–1389)

== In popular culture ==
- Portrayed by Jeon Sun-ae in the 1983 KBS1 TV series Foundation of the Kingdom.
- Portrayed by Kim Chang-sook in the 1983 MBC TV series The King of Chudong Palace.
- Portrayed by Seo Yi-an in the 2014 KBS TV series Jeong Do-jeon.
