= Paju Yeom clan =

Korean clan from Gyeonggi Province

Sangsan Lee clan
- Country: Korea
- Current region: Paju
- Founder: Yeom Hyeong myeong
- Connected members: Yeom Sin-Bi; Yeom Ki-hun; Yeom Kyung-yup; Yeom Han-woong; Andrew Yeom Soo-jung; Yeom Dong-jin; Yeom Sang-seop
- Website: http://www.pajuyom.kr/

Paju Yeom clan (Korean: 파주 염씨; Hanja: 坡州 廉氏) is one of the Korean clans. Their Bon-gwan is in Paju, Gyeonggi Province. According to the research held in 2015, the number of Paju Yeom clan was 63,350.

Their founder is Yeom Hyeong myeong, an ethnic Chinese person. He settled in Paju, Silla to avoid conflict during the Later Tang period. He supported Taejo of Goryeo and contributed to unifying three Korean dynasties. He was appointed High Merit Minister (Hanja: 壁上功臣).

== See also ==
- Korean clan names of foreign origin
