= Princess Noguk =

Mongolian Korean queen (died 1365)

Princess Supreme of Noh State 魯國大長公主 (Note: Modern Hangul: 노국대장공주) Лу Гуо Да Жан гүнж
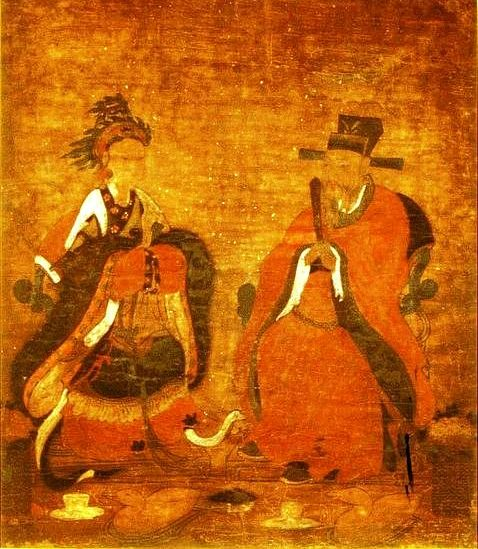
- Portrait of Princess Noguk and her husband, King Gongmin

Queen consort of Goryeo
- Tenure: 1351–1365
- Coronation: 1351
- Predecessor: Queen Consort Yun
- Successor: Queen Consort Yi
- Born: Borjigin Budashiri; Yuan dynasty
- Died: 8 March 1365; Goryeo
- Burial: Jeongneung Tomb, Haeseon-ri, Gaepung-gun, North Hwanghae Province
- Spouse: Gongmin of Goryeo (m. 1349–1365)
- Issue: Unnamed son (died after birth)
Names
- Mongolian name: Borjigin Budashiri (Боржигин Будашир); Sino-Korean name: Pae'ajigŭn/Bal'ajigun Botapsil'li (패아지근/발아지근 보탑실리; 孛兒支斤 寶塔實里)
Regnal name
- Princess Seungui (승의공주; 承懿公主)
Posthumous name
- Given by Goryeo: Queen Indeok (인덕왕후, 仁德王后; by King U); Queen Mother Indeok (인덕태후, 仁德太后; by King U); Grand Queen Mother Indeok Gongmyeong Jaye Seonan (인덕공명자예선안왕태후; 仁德恭明慈睿宣安王太后); Given by Northern Yuan: Princess Supreme Hwiui(ik) of the No State (휘의(익)노국대장공주, 徽懿魯國大長公主); Given by both of Goryeo and Yuan: Princess Supreme Indeok Gongmyeong Jaye Seonan Hwiui of the No State (인덕공명자예선안휘의노국대장공주; 仁德恭明慈睿宣安徽懿魯國大長公主)
- House: Borjigin (by birth); House of Wang (by marriage)
- Father: Bayir Temür
- Religion: Buddhism

- Princess Noguk
- Hangul: 노국대장공주
- Hanja: 魯國大長公主
- RR: Noguk daejang gongju
- MR: Noguk taejang kongju

Posthumous name
- Hangul: 인덕왕후
- Hanja: 仁德王后
- RR: Indeok wanghu
- MR: Indŏk wanghu

Personal name
- Hangul: 보탑실리
- Hanja: 寶塔實里
- RR: Botap silli
- MR: Pot'ap silli

Princess Supreme Noguk (Korean: 노국대장공주; Hanja: 魯國大長公主; lit. 'Princess-Aunt of the State of No'; d. 8 March 1365 (Note: In the Korean calendar (lunisolar), she died on 15 February 1365.)), also known as Queen Indeok (인덕왕후; 仁德王后) and Queen Mother Indeok (인덕태후; 仁德太后) during her stepson, King U of Goryeo's reign. She was a Yuan dynasty imperial family member as the great-granddaughter of Darmabala, and a niece of Princess Joguk who became a Korean queen consort though her marriage with Gongmin of Goryeo as his primary wife. Her personal name was Borjigin Budashiri (Mongolian: Будшир; Middle Mongolian: ᠪᠤᠳᠢᠰᠢᠷᠢ). She was the last Mongol to become queen consort of Goryeo.

== Biography ==
The future Princess Noguk was born Budashiri, a member of the Yuan dynasty's ruling Borjigin clan and a great-great-great-granddaughter of Kublai Khan. Though her birth year is unknown, she is recorded as having married the reformist monarch Gongmin of Goryeo in the Yuan capital of Khanbaliq in 1349, after which she went to live in Goryeo.

Noguk's marriage followed a practice established by Kublai Khan, where female members of the Yuan imperial clan were married to Goryeo princes in order to maintain Yuan hegemony on the Korean peninsula. By contrast with earlier marriages between the Yuan and Goryeo dynasties, however, Budashiri's marriage to Gongmin was described as happy and after her arrival in Goryeo, the Yuan gave Budashiri title as Princess Seungui (Korean: 승의공주; Hanja: 承懿公主).

When King Gongmin restored Goryeo's independence, the Princess rejected her homeland, and by helping her husband she monopolized his love to her. Despite their close relationship, they were childless. Budashiri then became pregnant fifteen years after marriage, but died in 1365 from complications related to the childbirth.

After her death, King Gongmin was said to have been deeply saddened and became indifferent to politics with entrusted great tasks to a Buddhist monk, Pyeonjo, who was executed in 1371. King Gongmin was killed in his sleep by Hong Ryun (홍륜), Choe Man-saeng (최만생), and others in 1374.

== Legacy ==
King Gongmin began the construction of a tomb near Kaeseong after the queen's death. The queen was interred under the mound Jeongreung, and her husband was later buried under an accompanying mound known as Hyeonreung.

In 1367, she posthumously received the title "princess supreme" (daejang gongju, 大長公主) – typically accorded to aunts of emperors (even though she was not). (Note: Her father's only known brother, Alu (阿魯), did not father any emperors, so she was not aunt to an emperor. There was precedence, however, to the title of "princess supreme" being bestowed to women who were not an emperor's aunt, for instance, Sengge Ragi, an emperor's sister.)

According to the Veritable Records of the Joseon Dynasty, the tenth king Yeonsan believed that Princess Noguk had looked similar to his mother, the deposed Queen Yun, so he collected the princess' portraits at government offices.

== In popular culture ==
=== Television series ===
- Portrayed by Sunwoo Eun-sook in the 1983 KBS TV series Foundation of the Kingdom.
- Portrayed by Seo Ji-hye in the 2005–2006 MBC TV series Shin Don.
- Portrayed by Park Se-young in the 2012 SBS TV series Faith.
- Portrayed by Bae Min-hee in the 2012–2013 SBS TV series The Great Seer.

=== Film ===
- Portrayed by Choi Eun-hee in the 1967 film A Tender Heart.

=== Novel ===
- Portrayed in the 1942 novel A Tender Heart (다정불심; a.k.a. "Tender Heartedness") by Park Jong-hwa.

== See also ==
- Goryeo under Mongol rule
- Tomb of King Kongmin
