= Seo Ji-hye =

South Korean actress (born 1984)

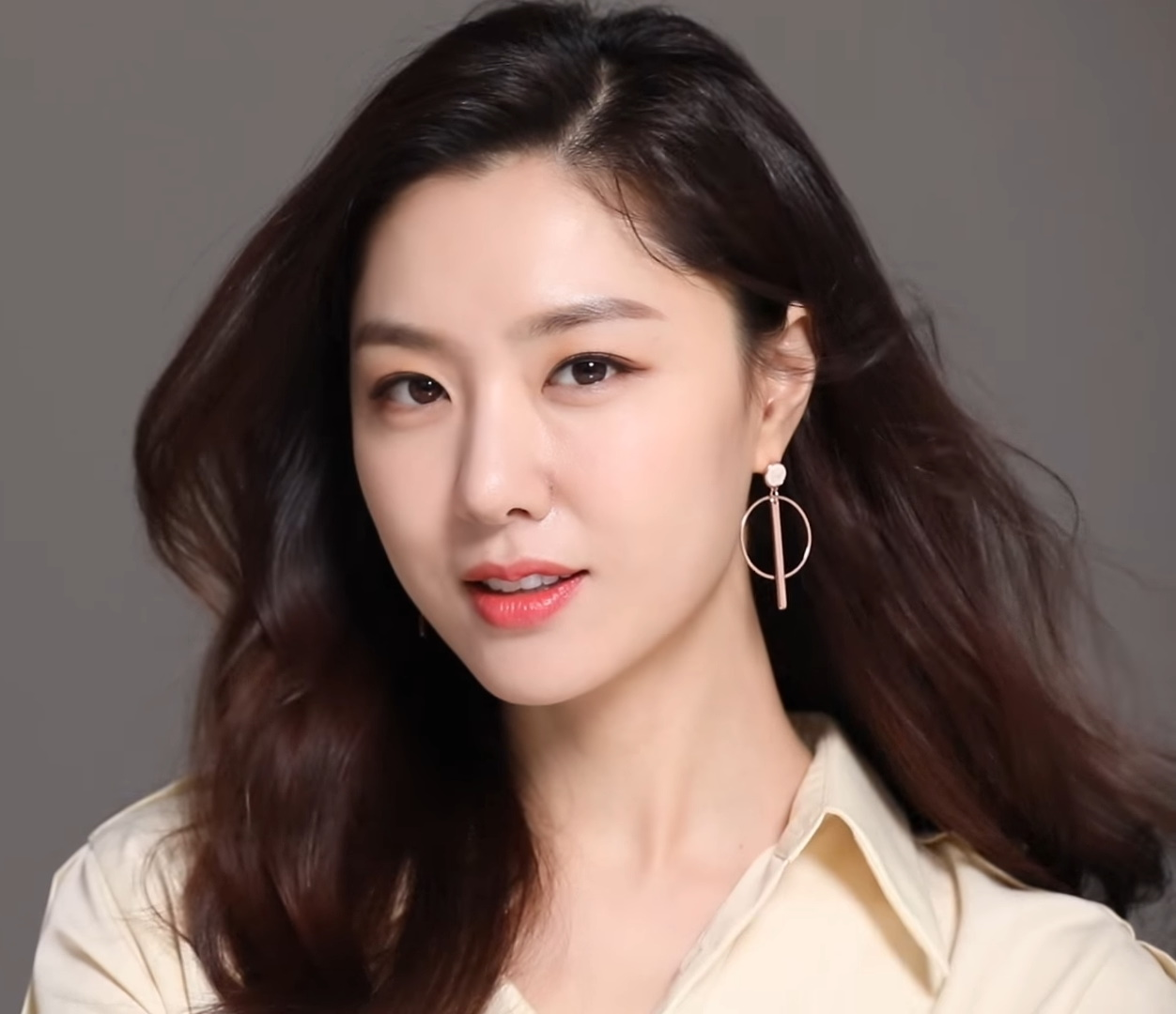
- Seo in May 2018
- Born: August 24, 1984 (age 42); Seoul, South Korea
- Education: Sungkyunkwan University
- Occupation: Actress
- Years active: 2003–present
- Agent: Ieum Hashtag

Korean name
- Hangul: 서지혜
- RR: Seo Jihye
- MR: Sŏ Chihye

Seo Ji-hye (Korean: 서지혜; born August 24, 1984) is a South Korean actress. After first attracting attention in the horror film Voice (2005), Seo has since starred in numerous television dramas, notably 49 Days (2011), Punch (2014), Don't Dare to Dream (2016), Crash Landing on You (2019), and Red Balloon (2022–2023).

== Filmography ==
Key
†	Denotes films that have not yet been released

=== Film ===
Year	Title	Role	Ref.
2005	Voice	Kang Seon-min	
2007	The Mafia, the Salesman	Han Soo-jung	
2010	A Lone Tree	Kim Soon-young	
2011	The Suicide Forecast	Lee Hye-in	
2018	Rampant	Concubine Jo	

=== Television series ===
Year	Title	Role	Ref.
2003	All In	Ae-sook/Mi-hee	
2003	Marriage Story: "Pickpocket Love"	Choi Soo-jin	
2004	Into the Storm	Yoo-ri	
2004	The Woman Who Wants to Marry	Song Yoo-ri	
2004	My 19 Year Old Sister-in-Law	Kang Ye-rim	
2005	Ice Girl	Cha Joo-ha	
2005	Shin Don	Princess Noguk/Ban-ya	
2005	MBC Best Theater: "Bird..."	Jung Eun-seo	
2006	Over the Rainbow	Ma Sang-mi	
2006	MBC Best Theater: "Who Is Living in That House?"	Tae-young	
2007	Legend of Hyang Dan	Hyangdan	
2008	I Love You	Na Young-hee	
2008	Chunja's Special Day	Yeon Boon-hong	
2010	Kim Su-ro, The Iron King	Heo Hwang-ok	
2010	KBS Drama Special: "Snail Gosiwon"	Mi-roo	
2011	49 Days	Shin In-jung	
2012	The Moon and Stars for You	Han Chae-won	
2013	Drama Festival: "Me, Dad, Mom, Grandma and Anna"	Mom	
2014	The Noblesse	Yoon Shin-ae	
2014	Punch	Choi Yeon-jin	
2016	Yeah, That's How It Is	Lee Ji-sun	
2016	Don't Dare to Dream	Hong Hye-won	
2017	Whisper	Choi Yeon-jin (cameo)	
2017–2018	Black Knight: The Man Who Guards Me	Sharon/Choi Seo-rin	
2018	Heart Surgeons	Yoon Soo-yeon	
2019–2020	Crash Landing on You	Seo Dan	
2020	Dinner Mate	Woo Do-hee	
2021	Dr. Brain	Lieutenant Choi	
2022	Kiss Sixth Sense	Hong Ye-sool	
2022	Adamas	Eun Hye-soo	
2022–2023	Red Balloon	Jo Eun-kang	
2024	Love Next Door	Jang Tae-Hui	
2026	Reverse	Myo-jin	

== Awards and nominations ==
Name of the award ceremony, year presented, category, nominee of the award, and the result of the nomination
Award ceremony	Year	Category	Nominee / Work	Result	Ref.
APAN Star Awards	2020	Excellence Award, Actress in a Miniseries	Crash Landing on You	Nominated	
Baeksang Arts Awards	2020	Bazaar Icon Award	Crash Landing on You	Won	
Baeksang Arts Awards	2020	Best Supporting Actress (TV)	Crash Landing on You	Nominated	
Gwangju International Film Festival	2015	Best TV Star	Punch	Won	
KBS Drama Awards	2012	Excellence Award, Actress in a Daily Drama	The Moon and Stars for You	Won	
KBS Drama Awards	2012	Netizen Award, Actress	The Moon and Stars for You	Nominated	
KBS Drama Awards	2018	Excellence Award, Actress in a Mid-length Drama	Black Knight: The Man Who Guards Me	Nominated	
MBC Drama Awards	2005	Best New Actress	Shin Don	Won	
SBS Drama Awards	2011	Excellence Award, Actress in a Drama Special	49 Days	Nominated	
SBS Drama Awards	2015	Special Award, Actress in a Mid-length Drama	Punch	Nominated	
SBS Drama Awards	2016	Special Acting Award, Actress in a Romantic Comedy Drama	Don't Dare to Dream	Won	
SBS Drama Awards	2018	Excellence Award, Actress in a Wednesday-Thursday Drama	Heart Surgeons	Won	
Seoul International Drama Awards	2021	Excellence Award, Actress	Dinner Mate	Nominated	
