= Faith (South Korean TV series) =

2012 South Korean television series

- Promotional poster
- Also known as: The Great Doctor
- Hangul: 신의
- Hanja: 信義
- RR: Sinui
- MR: Sinŭi
- Genre: Fantasy; Historical fusion Romance; Medical drama
- Written by: Song Ji-na
- Directed by: Kim Jong-hak; Shin Yong-hwi
- Starring: Lee Min-ho; Kim Hee-sun
- Music by: Oh Jun-seong
- Country of origin: South Korea
- Original language: Korean
- No. of episodes: 24

Production
- Production location: Korea
- Cinematography: Seok Deuk-won; Lee Young-cheol
- Running time: 60 minutes
- Production company: Faith SPC

Original release
- Network: SBS TV
- Release: 13 August – 30 October 2012

Faith (Korean: 신의; RR: Sinui; also known as The Great Doctor) is a 2012 South Korean television series starring Lee Min-ho and Kim Hee-sun. It was broadcast by SBS from August 13 to October 30, 2012, on Mondays and Tuesdays at 21:55 (KST) for 24 episodes. It is about a modern-day plastic surgeon, who is kidnapped and brought back in time to the Goryeo period, 700 years in the past, where she falls in love with her kidnapper, a warrior who is the leader of the royal guard.

== Title ==
The title Sin-ui, can mean faith, as in belief in justice. The Hanja 神醫 means Divine Doctor, but in Hangul it also means divine healer or great doctor.

== Synopsis ==
After King Gongmin of Goryeo (Ryu Deok-hwan) marries the Yuan princess, Noguk (Park Se-young), they return to Goryeo. On their way, they are attacked, and the queen is fatally injured. According to the advice of his royal advisor, the king orders the Captain of the Royal Guard, Choi Young (Lee Min-ho), to pass through a mystical portal ("heaven's gate") and find the "heaven's doctor". Choi Young travels to the future and brings back Yoo Eun-soo (Kim Hee-sun), a modern-day doctor from Seoul, to save the queen's life. He promises that he will return her to her world once she saves the queen, but the royal advisor schemes and persuades King Gongmin to force Eun-soo to stay as she can be useful to him.

As Eun-soo accustoms herself to her new surroundings, she and Choi Young gradually fall in love with each other. But problems arise as others become fascinated with her as the "Heaven's doctor", and Eun-soo becomes a pawn in the political power plays between King Gongmin, the Yuan overlords, the sociopathic nobleman Ki-chul (Yu Oh-seong) and Prince Deok-heung (Park Yoon-jae), King Gongmin's uncle. Constantly risking his life, Choi Young thwarts numerous attempts by Ki-chul and Deok-heung, who are out to have Eun-soo in their possession.

The series follows how Choi Young and Eun-soo evade and overcome impending problems and whether or not they succeed in getting her to heaven's door in time before it closes for good.

== Cast ==
=== Main ===
- Lee Min-ho – General Choi Young

In the mid-1300s, approximately 1352, Choi Young is a bodyguard to King Gongmin of the Goryeo Dynasty. He is 29 years old and has no regrets in life, no ambition for women or money, and his hobby is sleeping. As a brave captain and strategist of the Woodalchi warriors, he is not afraid of death.

- Kim Hee-sun – Yoo Eun-soo

A 33-year-old plastic surgeon in the year 2012. Eun-soo was originally a general surgeon but quickly found that it was an overworked, under-paid profession and jumped ship to plastic surgery. Her dream is to someday open her own practice. But one day a strange man whom she thinks is a drama extra kidnaps her and takes her back to the Goryeo era. In Goryeo, she is believed to be the apprentice of the famous Chinese surgeon, Hwata, sent from heaven.

=== Supporting ===
- Yu Oh-seong – Ki-chul
- Ryu Deok-hwan – King Gongmin
- Park Se-young – Princess Noguk, queen consort of King Gongmin
- Lee Phillip – Jang Bin
- Sung Hoon – Cheon Eum-ja
- Shin Eun-jung – Hwa-su-in
- Lee Byung-joon – Jo Il-shin
- Kim Mi-kyung – Court Lady Choi, Choi Young's aunt
- Park Sang-won – Sohn-yoo
- Baek Kwang-doo – Bae Choong-seok
- Kim Jong-moon – Oh Dae-man
- Kang Chang-mook – Deol-bae
- Yoon Kyun-sang – Oh Deok-man
- Kim Soo-yeon – Deo-ki
- Park Yoon-jae – Prince Deok-heung
- Jung Yoo-chan – Joo-seok
- Kwon Min – Ahn Do-chi
- Kim Hyun as Ji-ok's criminal
- Ahn Jae-wook – Eun-soo's doctor ex-boyfriend (cameo, ep. 1)
- Oh Kwang-rok – fortune teller (cameo, ep. 1)
- Choi Min-soo – Moon Chi-hoo, leader of Jeokwoldae (cameo, ep. 4)
- Oh Jae-moo – Yi Seong-gye

== Original soundtrack ==
Faith OST

Soundtrack album by Various artists
- Recorded: 2012
- Genre: Soundtrack
- Languages: Korean; English
- Labels: Loen Entertainment; Starhaus Entertainment

Part 1

Released on August 21, 2012
No.	Title	Artist	Length
1.	"Carry On" (계속하다)	Ali	4:22

Part 2

Released on September 3, 2012
No.	Title	Artist	Length
1.	"Because My Steps Are Slow" (걸음이느려서)	Shin Yong-jae (4Men)	4:27

Part 3

Released on September 11, 2012
No.	Title	Artist	Length
1.	"Bad Person" (나쁜사람)	Jang Hye-jin (ft. MC Sniper)	4:00

Part 4

Released on September 17, 2012
No.	Title	Artist	Length
1.	"Teardrop" (눈물이한방울)	Younha	3:54
2.	"Teardrop" (Inst.)		3:54
Total length:			7:08

Part 5

Released on September 24, 2012
No.	Title	Artist	Length
1.	"Look At" (그대를봄니다)	Sung Hoon (Brown Eyed Soul)	4:00

Part 6

Released on October 8, 2012
No.	Title	Artist	Length
1.	"The Wind's Song" (바람의노래)	Youngjun (Brown Eyed Soul)	3:38
2.	"Because It's You" (그대니까)	One Piece	3:34
Total length:			7:32

Part 7

Released on October 15, 2012
No.	Title	Artist	Length
1.	"Love" (사랑아)	Rumble Fish	4:46
2.	"Love" (Inst.)		4:46
Total length:			8:43

Disc 2:
No.	Title	Artist	Length
1.	"Faith (Opening title)"	Oh Joon-sung	2:59
2.	"Attack Point"	Oh Joon-sung	1:39
3.	"Bad Guy"	Oh Joon-sung	3:59
4.	"Bad Table"	Oh Joon-sung	3:01
5.	"Bloody Warrior"	Oh Joon-sung	1:36
6.	"Dancing in the Moonlight"	Oh Joon-sung	2:18
7.	"Forever (Carry on PP ver.)"	Oh Joon-sung	2:31
8.	"Faith (Choral ver.)"	Oh Joon-sung	2:59
9.	"Flower Garden"	Oh Joon-sung	2:14
10.	"Happy Dance"	Oh Joon-sung	2:09
11.	"I'm Woodalchi (Great Big Choi Young)"	Oh Joon-sung	1:51
12.	"I'm Woodalchi (String ver.)"	Oh Joon-sung	1:51
13.	"Knife Wood"	Oh Joon-sung	2:52
14.	"Missing You"	Oh Joon-sung	2:15
15.	"Moon of the Princess"	Oh Joon-sung	2:46
16.	"Move and Run (String ver.)"	Oh Joon-sung	1:36
17.	"Move and Run (Original ver.)"	Oh Joon-sung	2:13
18.	"Old Market"	Oh Joon-sung	1:38
19.	"Smile (Lovely Face Eun soo)"	Oh Joon-sung	2:28
20.	"Sadness (String ver.)"	Oh Joon-sung	2:55
21.	"Shadow Man"	Oh Joon-sung	3:38
22.	"The Blade of Red-Moon"	Oh Joon-sung	1:42
23.	"The Palace Story"	Oh Joon-sung	1:59
24.	"The Dangerous Time (Choral ver.)"	Oh Joon-sung	1:28
25.	"The Justice"	Oh Joon-sung	2:27
26.	"Tears of Soldier"	Oh Joon-sung	1:55
27.	"Trick"	Oh Joon-sung	1:30
28.	"War of the Fire"	Oh Joon-sung	1:44
29.	"White Night"	Oh Joon-sung	2:45
30.	"Witch Prayer"	Oh Joon-sung	2:01
31.	"Worry or Afraid"	Oh Joon-sung	1:48
32.	"You and Me"	Oh Joon-sung	1:34

== Production ==
Faith was '90s drama queen Kim Hee-sun's comeback project, her first TV appearance in five years after her marriage and childbirth. The production of Faith was riddled with problems. The initial budget was 10 billion won (about US$10 million) but the series got its budget slashed, and was pushed back multiple times because of the leading actor. The drama was announced in 2009 with Lee Joon-gi as a main lead. However, the actor had to be replaced because he was drafted in the army. Born in 1982, Lee would normally have time to enlist until the end of 2010 but he received his papers early, shortly after beginning his new film project. This forced him to drop Faith, as well as his horse-racing movie Grand Prix, which had already begun shooting. Lee had tried to postpone enlistment to finish these two projects by the end of the year, but was unable to do so.

He was replaced by Kang Ji-hwan (Coffee House) who, however, had to withdraw after a request by the Entertainment Management Association because of his ongoing contract dispute and legal fight with his former and current management companies. The antagonist, Kim Seung-soo, also left, with the majority of the original cast at that time. This was a severe blow to the budget, as 10 million won had reportedly been spent on promotion with Kang as the lead. Actors like Oh Ji-ho and Lee Sang-yoon were considered for the main role, before finally deciding for Lee Min-ho.

Filming for Faith began on May 24, 2012 and it aired from August 13 to October 30, 2012. The ratings were mediocre but rarely dropped below 10%.

On October 19, a little before the end, the news was published that Lee Phillip (who played Dr. Jang Bin), sustained an eye injury and had to pull out of the drama. The injury did not arise during drama filming, but because he was scheduled for surgery next week he would not be able to continue shooting. Many viewers agreed that "It's too bad that he leaves so close to the drama's finale without getting to be a part of it. On the other hand, it's both fortunate for the drama and a damn shame for him that he's barely a presence in the show to begin with, despite the setup hinting at a much meatier role".

The writer Song Ji-na uploaded the original script on her website and it was obvious that there were considerable changes in the final product, some of them because of lack of money. However, Faith had financial problems almost from its start and they did not finish after the drama wrapped. Six months after the end of its airing, many of the cast and crew of that drama had not been paid. The acting, editing, and producing salaries which had not been paid amounted to 1.7 billion won. Drama producer and direction Kim Jong-hak, whose credits include Eyes of Dawn, Sandglass, Daemang (2002) and Legend (2007), was accused of double-contracting the Faith OST rights (to two separate companies) in the fall of 2012 became the subject of a police investigation for embezzlement and breach of trust. Kim was sued in February 2013 under the charge that he had embezzled 2 billion for personal use and summoned by police for ongoing investigation. He took his own life on July 23, 2013, by carbon dioxide, in a gositel room. This tragic death and many of the "ills" of Korean dramas have been attributed to the outsourcing of production to independent companies which struggle to cover the exorbitant cost of writers and stars.

Faith was sold to 6 Asian countries including Japan, Indonesia, Singapore, and Malaysia, with 90% of the total pre-sales amount of ₩4 billion coming from Japan.

== Ratings ==
In the table below, the blue numbers represent the lowest ratings and the red numbers represent the highest ratings.

Ep.	Original broadcast date	Average audience share			
Ep.	Original broadcast date	Nielsen Korea		TNmS	
Ep.	Original broadcast date	Nationwide	Seoul	Nationwide	Seoul
1	August 13, 2012	9.4%	10.8%	12.2%	13.8%
2	August 14, 2012	10.3%	11.4%	11.8%	13.1%
3	August 20, 2012	10.3%	11.6%	13.4%	15.8%
4	August 21, 2012	11.5%	12.8%	13.2%	15.5%
5	August 27, 2012	10.6%	10.6%	12.9%	14.5%
6	August 28, 2012	12.2%	13.5%	13.1%	14.8%
7	September 3, 2012	9.8%	10.9%	12.3%	13.9%
8	September 4, 2012	11.0%	12.4%	12.6%	13.9%
9	September 10, 2012	11.8%	13.2%	11.6%	12.8%
10	September 11, 2012	11.2%	11.4%	11.7%	13.0%
11	September 17, 2012	10.4%	11.3%	11.8%	13.5%
12	September 18, 2012	10.1%	11.0%	11.2%	12.2%
13	September 24, 2012	9.7%	10.9%	10.7%	12.2%
14	September 25, 2012	9.0%	9.7%	10.2%	11.6%
15	October 1, 2012	9.3%	9.9%	11.1%	12.7%
16	October 2, 2012	9.5%	9.7%	9.6%	10.2%
17	October 8, 2012	10.5%	11.4%	13.2%	14.1%
18	October 9, 2012	9.9%	10.6%	11.5%	13.0%
19	October 15, 2012	8.8%	9.5%	9.2%	10.6%
20	October 16, 2012	9.9%	10.9%	10.7%	11.9%
21	October 22, 2012	9.3%	10.5%	10.2%	11.7%
22	October 23, 2012	8.9%	10.0%	9.7%	11.6%
23	October 29, 2012	8.7%	9.7%	9.1%	10.3%
24	October 30, 2012	10.1%	10.9%	10.5%	11.4%
Average		10.1%	11.0%	11.4%	12.8%

== Awards and nominations ==
Year	Award	Category	Recipient	Result
2012	20th Korean Culture and Entertainment Awards	Top Excellence Award, Actress	Kim Hee-sun	Won
2012	SBS Drama Awards	Top Excellence Award, Actor in a Miniseries	Lee Min-ho	Won
2012	SBS Drama Awards	Top Excellence Award, Actress in a Miniseries	Kim Hee-sun	Nominated
2012	SBS Drama Awards	Excellence Award, Actor in a Miniseries	Yu Oh-seong	Nominated
2012	SBS Drama Awards	Special Award, Actor in a Miniseries	Ryu Deok-hwan	Nominated
2012	SBS Drama Awards	Special Award, Actress in a Miniseries	Shin Eun-jung	Nominated
2012	SBS Drama Awards	New Star Award	Park Se-young	Won
2012	SBS Drama Awards	Top 10 Stars	Lee Min-ho	Won
2012	SBS Drama Awards	Popularity Award	Lee Min-ho	Nominated
2012	SBS Drama Awards	Popularity Award	Kim Hee-sun	Nominated
2013	49th Baeksang Arts Awards	Best New Actress (TV)	Park Se-young	Nominated
2013	49th Baeksang Arts Awards	Most Popular Actor (TV)	Lee Min-ho	Nominated
2013	49th Baeksang Arts Awards	Most Popular Actress (TV)	Park Se-young	Nominated
2013	8th Seoul International Drama Awards	Popularity Award	Lee Min-ho	Nominated
2014	GyaO! Entertainment Awards	Best Korean Drama	Faith	Won
