= Queen Sunjeong =

- Queen consort of Goryeo (posthumously)
- Born: 1347; Goryeo
- Died: 1376 (aged 26); Goryeo
- Burial: 1376; Uireung Tomb
- Spouse: Gongmin of Goryeo (m. 1357; died 1374)
- Issue: U of Goryeo _{(legal adoptive)}
Posthumous name
- Queen Seonmyeong Jesuk Gyeongui Sunjeong 선명제숙경의순정왕후 (宣明齊淑敬懿順靜王后)
- House: Goksan Han (by birth); House of Wang (by marriage)
- Father: Han Jun (한준)
- Mother: Lady Han (한씨)
- Religion: Buddhism

Korean name
- Hangul: 순정왕후
- Hanja: 順靜王后
- RR: Sunjeong wanghu
- MR: Sunjŏng wanghu

Queen Sunjeong of the Goksan Han clan (Korean: 순정왕후 한씨; Hanja: 順靜王后 韓氏; 1347 – 1376) was the second wife of King Gongmin of Goryeo who later became a queen consort after being declared the legitimate mother of his illegitimate son, King U. Prior to this she was called Palace Lady Han (궁인 한씨; 宮人 韓氏).

== Biography ==
=== Ancestry ===
Ancestors of Queen Sunjeong

Han Tong 한통
Han Pyeong 한평
Han Jun, Lord Myeonyang 한준 면양부원대군
Queen Sunjeong 순정왕후
Mr. Han 한씨
Han Ryang, Lord Myeonseong 한량 면성부원대군
Lady Han 한씨

=== Biography ===
In 1357 (6th year reign of Gongmin of Goryeo), she was chosen as the concubine of him and in the 1371, she was declared as the legal mother of Monino, the only son of King Gongmin. However, in 1374, it was falsely referred as the rebirth of the Han clan. Later, on November in the same year, she was posthumously honoured as Queen Sunjeong (순정왕후; 順靜王后; "the Serene and Silent Queen") and received her full Posthumous name along with her orientation in Hyemyeong Hall (혜명전; 惠明殿).

In September 1376 (2nd year reign of King U of Goryeo), she was buried in Uireung Tomb (의릉; 懿陵), Jeongneung-dong, Yeoreung-ri, Jungseo-myeon, Gaepung-gun, foot of Bongmyeong Mountain, west of Gaeseong which the location is corresponds to the west of Hyeolleung (현릉, 玄陵; King Gongmin's tomb) and Jeongneung (정릉, 正陵; Queen Indeok's tomb). However, in December 1389 (1st year reign of Gongyang of Goryeo), the tomb was abolished.

== In popular culture ==
- Portrayed by Choi Jung-won in the 2005–2006 MBC TV series Shin Don.
