= Foundation of the Kingdom =

1983 South Korean historical television series

- Hangul: 개국
- Hanja: 開國
- RR: Gaeguk
- MR: Kaeguk
- Genre: Historical
- Created by: Lee Tae-won
- Written by: Lee Eun-sung
- Directed by: Jang Hyung-il
- Starring: Im Hyuk; Im Dong-jin; Im Hyuk-joo
- Country of origin: South Korea
- Original language: Korean

Original release
- Network: KBS1
- Release: 2 January – 18 December 1983

Foundation of the Kingdom (Korean: 개국) is a 1983 South Korean historical television series. It aired on KBS1 from January 2, 1983 to December 18, 1983. The series revolves around the fall of Goryeo and the foundation of Joseon.

== Cast ==
=== Kingdom of Goryeo ===
- Im Hyuk as King Gongmin
- Lee Doo-sub as King Woo
- Kim Ar-eum as King Chang
- Kim Jin-hae as King Gongyang

==== People around King Gongmin ====
- Sunwoo Eun-sook as Princess Supreme Noguk
- Baek Chan-gi as Shin Don
- Chaeryung as Lady Ahn, Consort Jung
- Jo Nam-kyung as Lady Lee, Consort Hye
- Geum Bo-ra as Ban-Ya
- Kim Dong-wan as Ahn Do-chi
- Jungmin as Bo-Woo
- Lee Gye-young as Hong-Ryoon

==== People around King Woo ====
- Jeon Sung-ae as Lady Lee, Consort Geun
  - Lee Hyun-jung as young Lady Lee
- Kim Soo-yeon as Lady Choi, Consort Yeong
- Choi Gyung-sun as Lady Wang, Consort Seon

==== People around King Gongyang ====
- Park Hye-sook as Lady Noh, Consort Sun

=== Kingdom of Joseon ===
- Im Dong-jin as King Taejo
- Nam Sung-sik as King Jungjong
- Im Hyuk-joo as King Taejong

==== People around King Taejo ====
- Park Gyung-deuk as Lee Ja-choon, King Hwanjo
- Tae Hyun-shil as Lady Han, Queen Shinui
- Ha Mi-hye as Lady Kang, Queen Shinduk
- Kim Gyung-ha as Grand Prince Wanpung
- Tae Min-young as Grand Prince Jinahn
- Kim Gi-bok as Grand Prince Ikahn
- -- as Grand Prince Hoiahn
- Jeon Ho-jin as Grand Prince Dukahn

=== Others ===
- Shin Goo as Choi-Young, a Goryeo scholar
- Choi Hun-chul as King Wi of Yuan dynasty
- Baek Joon-gi as Ajibaldo, a Japanese man

== Awards and nominations ==
Year	Award	Category	Recipient	Result
1984	Baeksang Arts Awards	Best TV Actor	Im Dong-jin	Won
1984	Baeksang Arts Awards	Best Script	Lee Eun-sung	Won
