= The Great Seer =

2012 South Korean historical TV series

- Promotional poster for The Great Seer
- Also known as: The Great Geomancer
- Hangul: 대풍수
- Hanja: 大風水
- RR: Daepungsu
- MR: Taep'ungsu
- Genre: Historical
- Created by: Choi Moon-suk (episode 1-2); Kim Young-seop (episode 3-35)
- Written by: Nam Sun-nyeo; Park Sang-hee
- Directed by: Lee Yong-suk
- Creative directors: Park Sun-ho; Song Min-sun
- Starring: Ji Sung; Ji Jin-hee; Song Chang-eui; Kim So-yeon; Lee Yoon-ji
- Country of origin: South Korea
- Original language: Korean
- No. of episodes: 35

Production
- Executive producers: Kim Young Sub; SBS Drama
- Producers: Lee Dong Hoon Kyung Min Suk Lee Young Joon
- Running time: 65
- Production company: Red Rover

Original release
- Network: SBS TV
- Release: 10 October 2012 – 7 February 2013

The Great Seer (Korean: 대풍수; RR: Daepungsu, also known as The Great Geomancer) is a 2012 South Korean historical television series, starring Ji Sung, Ji Jin-hee, Song Chang-eui, Kim So-yeon and Lee Yoon-ji. Set during the turbulent decline of Goryeo, it is about practicers of divination and the power that they hold over the fate of the country. It aired on SBS from October 10, 2012 to February 7, 2013 on for 35 episodes.

== Plot ==
The Great Seer begins during the reign of King Gongmin (Ryu Tae-joon). But despite being about seers, geomancers, divinators and the like, this drama is less about the fantasy and more about the political movers and shakers — people who had the power to advise, and therefore control, kings. Yi Seong-gye (Ji Jin-hee) is the general who led the overthrow of Goryeo and established the Joseon Dynasty, becoming its first king.

Mok Ji-sang (Ji Sung) is a gifted seer/geomancer, born with the ability to see into people's pasts and futures. There are those who believe falsely that he has dark supernatural powers, thinking him possessed by ghosts. When he comes of age in the late Goryeo era, he becomes a scholar of divination, and a reader of geography, faces, and the like to tell fortunes — an area with much influence at the time. He eventually becomes a "king-maker," who holds the key to a major political shift in the overthrow of Goryeo and the rise of Joseon when he backs General Yi and effectively shapes the future of Korea as we know it.

Lee Jung-geun (Song Chang-eui) is General Yi's other advisor and Ji-sang's rival. Hae-in (Kim So-yeon) is a healer whose destiny is tied to General Yi, but she falls in love with the seer. Ban-ya (Lee Yoon-ji) is a woman who was sold off as a gisaeng at a young age, but becomes a concubine to King Gongmin's advisor, and bears a son. King Gongmin takes in that son as his, and the boy becomes Woo of Goryeo (Lee Tae-ri) — the king that General Yi dethrones in a coup d'état.

== Cast ==
- Ji Sung as Mok Ji-sang
  - Lee David as young Ji-sang
  - Choi Ro-woon as child Ji-sang
- Ji Jin-hee as Yi Seong-gye
- Kim So-yeon as Hae-in
  - Son Na-eun as young Hae-in
- Song Chang-eui as Lee Jung-geun
  - Noh Young-hak as young Jung-geun
- Lee Yoon-ji as Ban-ya
  - Park Min-ji as young Ban-ya
- Jo Min-ki as Lee In-im
- Oh Hyun-kyung as Soo Ryun-gae
- Lee Seung-yeon as Young-ji
  - Lee Jin as young Young-ji
- Lee Young-beom as Hyo-myung
- Choi Jae-woong as Dong-ryoon
- Ahn Gil-kang as Monk Muhak
- Kim Gu-taek as Lee Ji-ran
- Do Ki-seok as Woo Ya-sook
- Baek Seung-hyeon as Jeong Do-jeon
- Kang Kyung-hun as Bong-choon
- Yoon Joo-hee as Lady Kang, Seong-gye's wife
- Oh Hee-joon as Yi Bang-gwa
- Choi Tae-joon as Yi Bang-won
- Kim Tae-hee as Dan-wi
- Jung Dong-kyu as Han Choong
- Seol Yoo-jin as Han Choong's servant
- Park Min-jung as In-yeong, owner of gisaeng house
- Ryu Tae-joon as King Gongmin
- Bae Min-hee as Princess Noguk
- Kim Chung as Queen Dowager Myeongdeok
- Lee Tae-ri (Note: Credited as Lee Min-ho.) as King Woo
  - Jung Joon-won as young Woo
- Kim Byung-choon as King Gongyang
- Lee Moon-sik as Hong Jong-dae
- Jo Han-chul as Moo-young
- Lee Won-jae as Noh Young-soo
- Cha Hyun-woo as Won-hae
- Son Byong-ho as Choe Yeong
- Yoo Ha-joon as Shin Don
- Lee Yoo-sung as Hong Ryun
- Park Joon-hyuk as Jeong Mong-ju
- Lee Do-yeop as Yi Kang-dal
- Kim Min-hyuk as Won-gae
- Kim Da-hyun as Sung-bok
  - Joo Min-soo as young Sung-bok
- Moon Hee-kyung as Daemuryeo
- Jung Soo-in as gisaeng
- Hong Yi-joo as Wol-hyang
- Lee Yong-jin as Yi Ga-noh
- Jo Hwa-young as Yoo Sun
- Chun Bo-geun as patron saint
- Kim Ik-tae as viceroy for the Ming Dynasty
- Kim Beom-seok as royal escort warrior
- Lee Seok-joon as Jo Min-soo
- Ban Min-jung as Lady Park
- Kim Sung-hoon as executioner
- Jin Seon-kyu as Lee Han-baek
- Jeon Jin-seo

== Original soundtrack ==
1. "Breaking Fate" - Park Gyu-ri of Kara
2. "Flower" (kids version) - Shin Ye-rim
3. "Flower" (adult version) - Yo Ar
4. "Tears Flow" - Min Kyu
5. "Just Once" - Kyuhyun of Super Junior
6. "The Path to the Sky" - Chi Yeol
7. "With You Being the Only Reason" - Ock Joo-hyun

== Promotions ==
To promote the series cast members Ji Jin-hee, Ji Sung and Song Chang-eui guest starred on the SBS Good Sunday variety show Running Man on episodes 116 and 117, which aired on October 21 and 28, 2012, along with Suzy of miss A and Yubin of Wonder Girls.

== Ratings ==
Episode	Broadcast Date	TNmS ratings		AGB ratings	
Episode	Broadcast Date	Nationwide	Seoul	Nationwide	Seoul
1	2012-10-10	6.9%	7.7%	6.5%	6.7%
2	2012-10-11	6.9%	8.1%	7.0%	7.7%
3	2012-10-17	10.4%	11.7%	10.6%	11.8%
4	2012-10-18	7.8%	8.4%	7.6%	8.5%
5	2012-10-24	9.4%	11.0%	9.3%	9.8%
6	2012-10-25	9.8%	10.7%	9.7%	10.8%
7	2012-10-31	10.1%	11.9%	9.8%	10.6%
8	2012-11-01	10.3%	11.6%	10.1%	10.6%
9	2012-11-07	8.7%	10.0%	8.4%	9.4%
10	2012-11-08	9.9%	10.5%	8.7%	8.9%
11	2012-11-14	9.6%	11.2%	8.1%	8.3%
12	2012-11-15	9.8%	11.6%	9.0%	9.2%
13	2012-11-21	7.5%	8.8%	6.9%	7.6%
14	2012-11-22	8.3%	9.0%	8.8%	9.4%
15	2012-11-28	7.7%	9.3%	7.5%	7.8%
16	2012-11-29	8.0%	8.7%	8.8%	9.1%
17	2012-12-05	8.1%	8.6%	7.9%	8.1%
18	2012-12-06	10.0%	10.7%	9.0%	9.9%
19	2012-12-12	7.5%	8.5%	8.0%	9.0%
20	2012-12-13	7.8%	8.9%	9.1%	9.7%
21	2012-12-20	8.1%	9.0%	8.2%	9.1%
22	2012-12-26	9.4%	10.2%	8.5%	9.5%
23	2012-12-27	10.1%	10.6%	9.8%	10.3%
24	2013-01-02	10.4%	11.9%	8.8%	9.2%
25	2013-01-03	10.3%	11.8%	10.8%	11.3%
26	2013-01-09	9.5%	10.5%	9.4%	9.3%
27	2013-01-10	10.7%	12.2%	10.2%	9.5%
28	2013-01-16	10.3%	11.5%	9.3%	9.2%
29	2013-01-17	11.6%	12.8%	10.2%	10.3%
30	2013-01-23	9.6%	10.6%	9.6%	10.0%
31	2013-01-24	11.1%	12.6%	9.0%	9.3%
32	2013-01-30	9.3%	11.2%	9.1%	9.2%
33	2013-01-31	9.9%	11.4%	9.6%	10.4%
34	2013-02-06	10.0%	11.4%	9.5%	10.0%
35	2013-02-07	10.3%	11.4%	8.8%	8.9%
