= Gwangju Kim clan =

Korean clan

- Country: North and South Korea
- Current region: Gwangju
- Founder: Kim Nok-gwang

The Gwangju Kim clan (Korean: 광주 김씨; Hanja: 廣州 金氏) is a Korean clan with its bon-gwan located in Gwangju, Gyeonggi.

== History ==
The members of the Gwangju Kim clan are the descendants of Kim Nok-gwang (김녹광; 金祿光). He served as a general during the Mongol invasions of Korea in the 23rd year of King Gojong’s reign (1236). He distinguished himself by repelling the invaders.

== Notable people ==
- Kim Koeng (김굉; 金閎): Son of Kim Nok-gwang. He passed the Korean royal examination in the 2nd year of Kangjong of Goryeo (1213).
- Kim Hwon (김훤; 金晅): Son of Kim Koeng. He passed the Korean royal examination in the 1st year of Wonjong of Goryeo (1260). In 1277, he served as the defense commander of Geumju (금주; 金州). The populace of Milseong (밀성; 密城) killed their chancellor in a rebellion, and Hwon quashed the rebellion.
