= Koksan Han clan =

Korean clan from North Hwanghae Province

- Country: Korea
- Current region: Koksan County
- Founder: Han Ye

The Koksan Han clan (Korean: 곡산 한씨; Hanja: 谷山 韓氏) is a Korean clan. Their Bon-gwan is located in Koksan County, North Hwanghae Province. According to the research in 2015, the number of Koksan Han clan was 6266. Their founder was Han Ye. He was one of Eight Scholars (Hanja: 八學士), and was dispatched from Song dynasty to Goryeo in 1206. After that, he was naturalized and served as munha sirang pyeongjangsa (Korean: 문하시랑평장사; Hanja: 門下侍郞平章事). He was appointed as Prince of Koksan (Hanja: 谷山君). Finally, he began Koksan Han clan and made Koksan their Bon-gwan.

== See also ==
- Korean clan names of foreign origin
