= Goseong Lee clan =

Korean clan from South Gyeongsang Province

- Country: North and South Korea
- Current region: Goseong County, South Gyeongsang Province
- Origin: Korean Peninsula
- Founder: Yi Hwang
- Connected members: Lee Pil-mo; Lee Seo-jin; Yi Sang-ryong; Yi Gwal; Royal Consort Geun of the Goseong Yi clan
- Website: http://gosunglee.com/

The Goseong Lee clan (Korean: 고성 이씨; Hanja: 固城 李氏) is a Korean clan. Their bon-gwan is in Goseong County, South Gyeongsang Province. According to the census held in 2015, the number of members was 104,768. Their founder was Yi Hwang, who was appointed as Lord of Goseong after he successfully defeated the Khitans. Yi Hwang lived during the reign of King Deokjong of Goryeo. He was supposedly the 24th descendant of a certain Li Pan (Chinese: 李槃) from the Han dynasty, who had entered the Korean peninsula during Emperor Wu's conquest of Wiman Joseon.

== Notable members ==
- Royal Consort Geun of the Goseong Yi clan, 14th-century Queen of Goryeo.
- Royal Princess Hyesun of the Goseong Yi clan (혜순궁주 이씨; ? – 5 March 1438), consort of Taejong of Joseon
- Lee Eung-tae (1555–1586), the subject of a famous letter from his bereaved wife and later a mummy that was recently studied

== See also ==
- Korean clan names of foreign origin
