= Ch'oe Yŏng =

Korean general (1316–1388)

Ch'oe Yŏng 최영
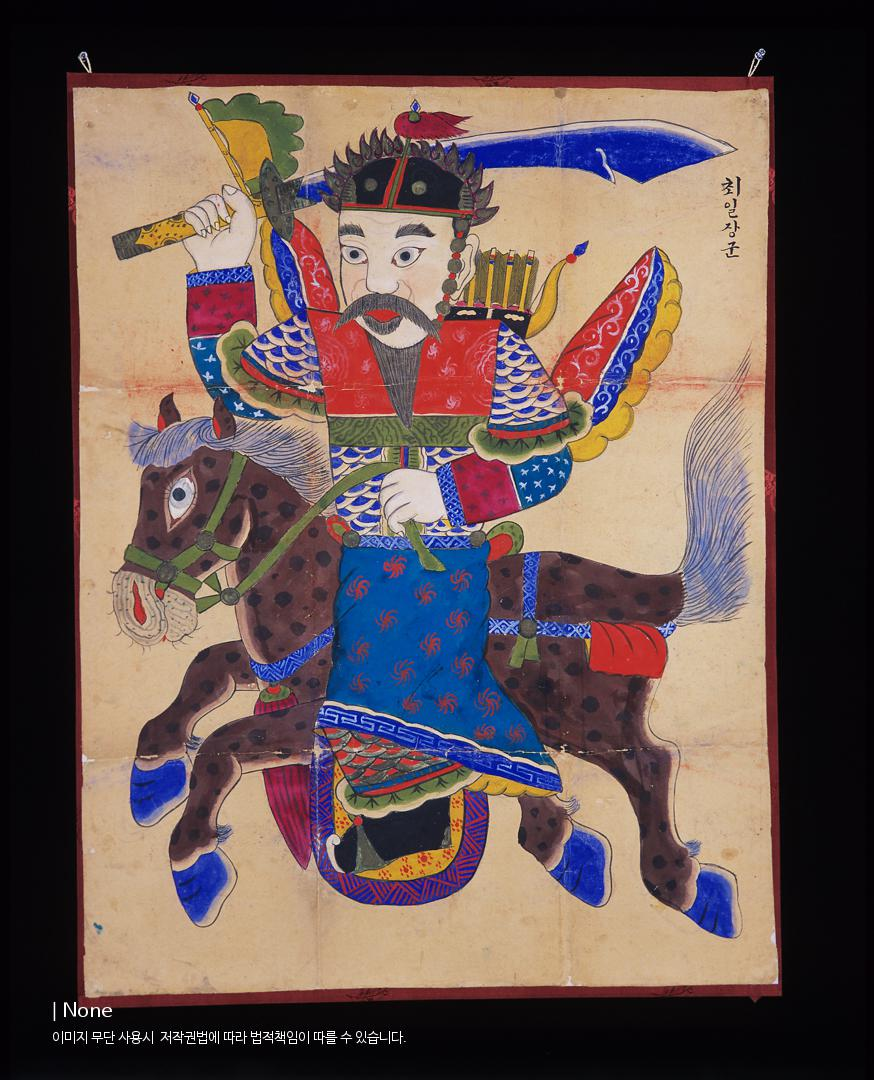
- Born: 1316; Cheorwon, Goryeo
- Died: 1388 (aged 71–72); Kaesong, Goryeo
- Burial place: Goyang
- Spouse(s): Lady Yu, of the Munhwa Yu clan
- Children: Ch'oe Dam (son); Royal Consort Yŏng; Lady Ch'oe
- Relatives: Ch'oe Won-jik (father); Lady Chi, of the Bongsan Chi clan (mother)
- Military career
- Allegiance: Goryeo

Korean name
- Hangul: 최영
- Hanja: 崔瑩
- RR: Choe Yeong
- MR: Ch'oe Yŏng

Posthumous name
- Hangul: 무민
- Hanja: 武愍
- RR: Mumin
- MR: Mumin

Ch'oe Yŏng (Korean: 최영; Hanja: 崔瑩; 1316–1388), also romanized as Choi Young, was a Korean general born in Hongseong or Cheorwon during the Goryeo period. He became a national hero after he put down Cho Il-sin's Rebellion (조일신의 난). He also participated in the Red Turban Rebellions and later allied with the Ming dynasty to overthrow the Mongol Yuan dynasty. In his final years, General Ch'oe was betrayed and executed by his former subordinate Yi Sŏng-gye, who founded the Joseon dynasty of Korea, bringing an end to the Goryeo period.

== Early years ==
Ch'oe Yŏng was born into the prestigious Cheorwon (more recently known as Dongju) Ch'oe noble clan as the fifth generation descendant of Ch'oe Yu-ch'ŏng, the Grand Scholar of Jiphyeonjeon, the Royal Academy, and the son of Ch'oe Wŏn-jik. He was raised in a strict austere lifestyle, befitting a noble aristocratic family of Goryeo. He paid little heed to what he wore and ate, and eschewed fine garments and other comforts even after becoming famous and successful. He disliked men who desired expensive articles, and he viewed simplicity as a virtue. Ch'oe Yŏng's motto, left to him by his father, was to regard gold as nothing but mere rocks.

== Military career ==
=== Cho Il-sin and Japan ===
Based on his character and beliefs, Ch'oe Yŏng was well-suited for the military. In the military, Ch'oe Yŏng quickly gained the confidence of both his men and the king due to numerous victories against Japanese pirates (Wokou) who began raiding the Korean coast around 1350.

In 1352, at the age of 36, Ch'oe Yŏng became a national hero after he successfully put down a rebellion by Cho Il-sin when insurgents surrounded the royal palace, killing many officials.

=== Red Turban rebellions ===
As Goryeo was a tributary, or "Bumaguk (son-in-law nation)", to the Mongol Yuan dynasty since 1259, Ch'oe Yŏng was sent to help the Yuan forces quash insurgents during the Red Turban Rebellion in northern China. In 1354, at the age of 39, he deployed to northern China with 2,000 Korean mounted archers, and was reinforced in Kanbaluk by 20,000 veterans of the Goryeo Tumens. Together they suppressed the Red Turban Rebellion and returned home to Goryeo. However, later the Yuan dynasty was overthrown by the uprisings of Zhu Yuanzhang, who founded the Ming dynasty, and Chen Youliang, who founded the Chen Han dynasty.

Ch'oe Yŏng's success in nearly 30 different battles won him even more fame and favor at home. Upon returning to Korea, he dutifully reported to King Gongmin about the internal problems troubling the waning Yuan dynasty, which gave the king the idea that the time was opportune to reclaim some of the northern territories previously lost to the Mongols. General Ch'oe fought to recover various towns west of the Yalu River to the great delight of King Gongmin. In 1356, he attacked and received the surrender of the Mongol-Korean Darughachi of Ssangseong Chonggwanbu in what is now Wonsan, where the former Goryeo ruling aristocrats had surrendered their fiefdoms to the Mongols prior to Goryeo's national surrender of sovereignty in 1259. The surrendering darughachi of Ssangseong was none other than Yi Cha-ch'un, whose son, the deputy darhughachi, was Yi Sŏng-gye, the future founder of the Joseon dynasty.

In 1360, Ch'oe Yŏng defeated the Red Turbans during the Red Turban invasions of Goryeo. On April 15, 1363, Kim Yong, a senior Goryeo official attempted to assassinate the king while he was staying at Hŭngwang-sa Temple. General Ch'oe and his army were able to defeat the rebels and rescue the king, arresting the rebellion's ringleader, Kim Yong.

Ch'oe Yŏng served briefly as the mayor of Pyongyang, where his efforts at increasing crop production and mitigating famine won him even more attention as a national hero. In 1364, he distinguished himself further when he defeated a former prince of Goryeo, Prince Deokheung, who tried to overthrow King Gongmin for asserting independence from the Yuan dynasty. Ch'oe Yu, appointed by Empress Gi of Yuan to accompany Deokheung, invaded Goryeo with 10,000 Mongol cavalry to overthrow the rebellious king. Upon his crossing of the Yalu River, the provincial commander, An U-gyŏng (안우경) fought against him until Ch'oe Yŏng's arrival. Their combined forces defeated the Mongol Tumen of 10,000, solidifying the final defiance and independence of Goryeo dynasty from the Mongols in 1364.

=== Yuan-Ming dynasties ===
In 1368, when the new Ming dynasty of China offered an alliance against the Mongols, King Gongmin ordered Ch'oe Yŏng to invade the remaining Mongol garrisons in Manchuria. Ch'oe Yŏng maneuvered north of the Yalu River and captured Oro Mountain Fortress and the city of Liaoyang in 1370, but this did not lead to a permanent settlement.

== Betrayal and redemption ==
Following a dream that he thought predicted that a Buddhist monk would save his life, King Gongmin promoted a monk named Sin Ton to a lofty position within his court and allowed him considerable influence. At first, Sin Ton toiled to improve the lives of the peasants despite great opposition from the ministers; however, with the king's support Sin Ton grew increasingly ruthless and corrupt. Ch'oe Yŏng, who vigorously opposed corruption in the kingdom, found himself at odds with the monk, and subsequently, Sin Ton engineered false accusations of misconduct against Ch'oe Yŏng that resulted in a punishment of six years in exile and brought him dangerously close to execution. However, after Sin Ton's death in 1374, Gongmin restored Ch'oe Yŏng to his previous position.

In 1374, the Mongol horse herders on Tamna Island rebelled against the Goryeo court after being asked for their horses to send to the Ming as supplies against their fellow Mongols of the Yuan. To crush the rebellion, Goryeo assembled a force of 314 ships and 25,605 troops. General Ch'oe was picked as its commander. On October 4, Ch'oe Yŏng landed on Tamna and engaged the Mongols, who fought tenaciously, but Ch'oe's forces quickly freed the island. The three ringleaders of the revolt were executed and their heads sent to the capital. Then, in 1376, the Japanese pirates advanced into Goryeo and captured the city of Gongju. With the new gunpowder recipe obtained by scientist Ch'oe Mu-sŏn, General Ch'oe and his subordinate, Yi Sŏng-gye, routed and defeated the pirates, and reclaimed Gongju.

== Final years ==
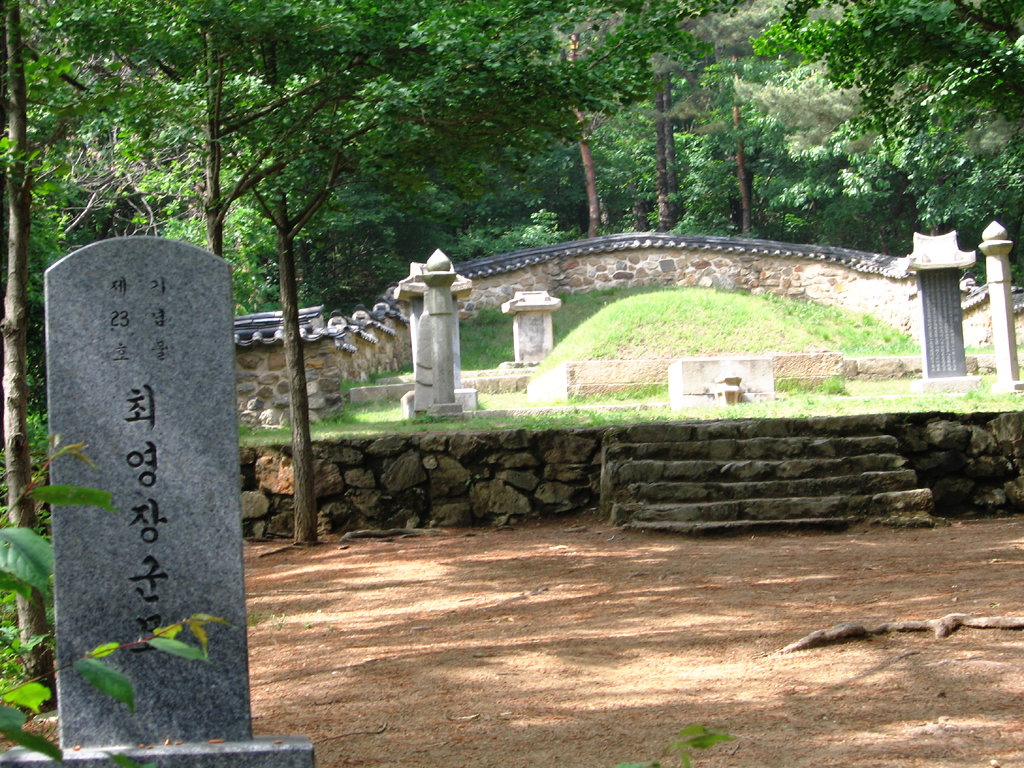
Tomb of General Ch'oe Yŏng

General Ch'oe was betrayed and executed by his former subordinate Yi Sŏng-gye.

In 1388, General Yi Sŏng-gye was ordered to use his armies to push the Ming forces out of the Liaodong peninsula. Yi Sŏng-gye opposed the northern expedition, citing four reasons:

1. A smaller nation should not attack a larger nation, as it goes against the Confucian order of the world
2. It is harsh to campaign during the summer farming season, as it will result in a poor harvest for the populace
3. With the bulk of the men away to the north, Japanese pirates will have free rein in the south
4. Monsoon rains will reduce the effectiveness of composite bows, the army's main weapon, and will encourage the spread of infectious diseases in the camps.

General Ch'oe ordered the invasion nevertheless, supported by the young King U. However, knowing the support he enjoyed from high-ranking government officials and the general populace, Yi Sŏng-gye decided to return to the capital, Gaegyeong, and trigger a coup d'état. This incident later became famous as the Wihwado Retreat and became the first sign of the change of dynasty.

When Yi Sŏng-gye returned to the capital, Ch'oe Yŏng put up a gallant defense at the palace, but was outnumbered and overwhelmed. General Ch'oe was defeated, captured, and banished to Goyang and was later beheaded by Yi Sŏng-gye's government. Before the execution, Ch'oe was famously known to have predicted that due to his unjust demise, grass would never grow on his grave. Grass did not grow on his grave until 1976 and it became known as Jeokbun (적분), which means red grave, because of the red soil.

== Family ==
- Father: Ch'oe Wŏn-jik (최원직; 崔元直)
- Mother: Lady Chi, of the Bongsan Chi clan (부인 봉산 지씨; 夫人 鳳山 智氏)
- Wives and children:
  - Lady Yu, of the Munhwa Yu clan (부인 문화 유씨; 夫人 文化 柳氏)
    - Son: Ch'oe Tam (최담; 崔潭)
    - Daughter: Lady Ch'oe (부인 최씨; 夫人 崔氏)
  - Lady Ŭn (부인 은씨; 夫人 殷氏)
    - Daughter: Royal Consort Ch'oe Yeong-bi (영비 최씨; 寧妃 崔氏)

== In popular culture ==
- Portrayed by Shin Goo in the 1983 KBS1 TV series Foundation of the Kingdom.
- Portrayed by Kim Gil-ho in the 1983 MBC TV series The King of Chudong Palace.
- Portrayed by Kim Sung-ok in the 1996-98 KBS1 TV series Tears of the Dragon.
- Portrayed by Choi Sang-hoon in the 2005-06 MBC TV series Shin Don.
- Portrayed by Lee Min-ho in the 2012 SBS TV series Faith.
- Portrayed by Son Byong-ho in the 2012-13 SBS TV series The Great Seer.
- Portrayed by Seo In-seok in the 2014 KBS1 TV series Jeong Do-jeon.
- Portrayed by Jeon Guk-hwan in the 2015-16 SBS TV series Six Flying Dragons.
- Portrayed by Song Yong-tae in the 2021–2022 KBS1 The King of Tears, Lee Bang-won.

== See also ==
- Yi Sŏng-gye
- King Gongmin
- Chŏng Mong-ju
