= Shin Don (TV series) =

2005–2006 South Korean TV series

- Hangul: 신돈
- Hanja: 辛旽
- RR: Sin Don
- MR: Sin Ton
- Genre: Historical; Political
- Based on: The Phantom Queen by Park Jong-hwa
- Developed by: Jung Woon-hyung
- Written by: Jung Ha-yeon
- Directed by: Kim Jin-min
- Creative directors: Lee Sang-yup; Lee Kyung-sun
- Starring: Son Chang-min; Jeong Bo-seok; Seo Ji-hye; Oh Man-seok; Kang Moon-young
- Narrated by: Kim Jae-gyu
- Composers: Hwang Sang-joon; No Hyung-woo; Ryu Hyung-wook; Kim Chang-bum
- Country of origin: South Korea
- Original language: Korean
- No. of episodes: 61

Production
- Producers: An Je-hyun; Shin Sang-yoon
- Cinematography: Song In-hyuk
- Animator: Jang Tae-joon
- Editor: Hwang Keum-bong
- Running time: 60 minutes
- Production company: Samhwa Networks

Original release
- Network: MBC
- Release: September 24, 2005 – May 7, 2006

Shin Don (Korean: 신돈) is a South Korean television series based on the novel The Phantom Queen (다정불심; 多情佛心; Dajeongbulsim) by Park Jong-hwa, starring Son Chang-min, Jeong Bo-seok, Seo Ji-hye, Oh Man-seok and Kang Moon-young. It aired on MBC from September 24, 2005 to May 7, 2006 every Saturday and Sunday at 21:40 (KST).

This series's first title was originally the same as the title of the novel but later was changed after Son Chang-min took the main role as Shin Don. Son also made his first appearance in a sageuk since Tale of Chunhyang (춘향전) in 1988.

== Cast ==
=== Main ===
- Son Chang-min as Shin Don
  - Kim Kyung-hwan as young Shin Don
- Jeong Bo-seok as King Gongmin
- Seo Ji-hye as
  - Princess Noguk, King Gongmin's first wife and a Yuan Princess.
  - Banya, King Gongmin's concubine and Shin Don's maid.
    - Bang Joon-seo as young Banya
    - Jeon Ha-eun as child Banya
- Oh Man-seok as Won Hyung
- Kang Moon-young as Cho Sun

=== Extended cast ===
- Hwang Geum-hee (Note: Credited as Ji Sung-won.) as Lady Yoon Hee-bi
- Lee Bong-kyoo as Ra Ma-seung
- Kim Jong-ho as a fisherman
- Lee Jin-hwa as Woo Dae-un
- Lee Chang-hwan as Shin Won-kyung
- Yang Eun-yong as a maid-servant in Okcheon Temple
- Jeon Su-ji as Ban Ya's birth mother
- Guk Jung-hwan as Ki-Chul's head servant
- Han Young-soo as Cho-Sun's head servant
- Choi Eun-sook as Lee Je-hyun's wife

== OST ==
Shin Don OST

Soundtrack album by Various artists
- Released: January 19, 2006
- Genre: Soundtrack
- Length: 56-57 minutes
- Language: Korean
- Label: Samhwa Production

No.	Title	Length
1.	"Shin Don (신돈)" (Opening Theme Song)	04:47
2.	"Shin Don (신돈)" (Inst.)	03:39
3.	"King Gongmin (공민왕)"	02:57
4.	"Jajangga (자장가)" (Voice ver.)	03:21
5.	"Yeomhwamiso (염화미소)"	02:45
6.	"Young Shin Don (어린신돈)" (Vn ver.)	02:33
7.	"Buddha (부다)"	02:23
8.	"A Mongol's Woman, Dotapsilli (몽골의 여인 도탑실리)"	02:23
9.	"The Dragon's Shadow (용상의 그림자)"	02:29
10.	"Shin Don (신돈)" (Ver. 2)	02:16
11.	"Princess of No State (노국공주)"	03:12
12.	"For 民樂"	02:04
13.	"Young Shin Don (어린신돈)" (Voice ver.)	02:32
14.	"Joins (가담; 街談)"	01:45
15.	"Jajangga (자장가)" (Inst.)	03:21
16.	"On Saemiro (온새미로)"	04:19
Total length:		56:36

== Airing cancel reasons ==
- October 15, 2005: canceled due to MBC University Organization.
- December 31, 2005: canceled due to the airing of MBC Gayo Daejejeon.
- January 1, 2006: canceled due to the New Year's Special Event.
- January 28–29, 2006: canceled due to the formation of Lunar New Year special film Another Public Enemy and Innocent Steps.
