= Gongmin of Goryeo =

King of Goryeo from 1351 to 1374

Gongmin
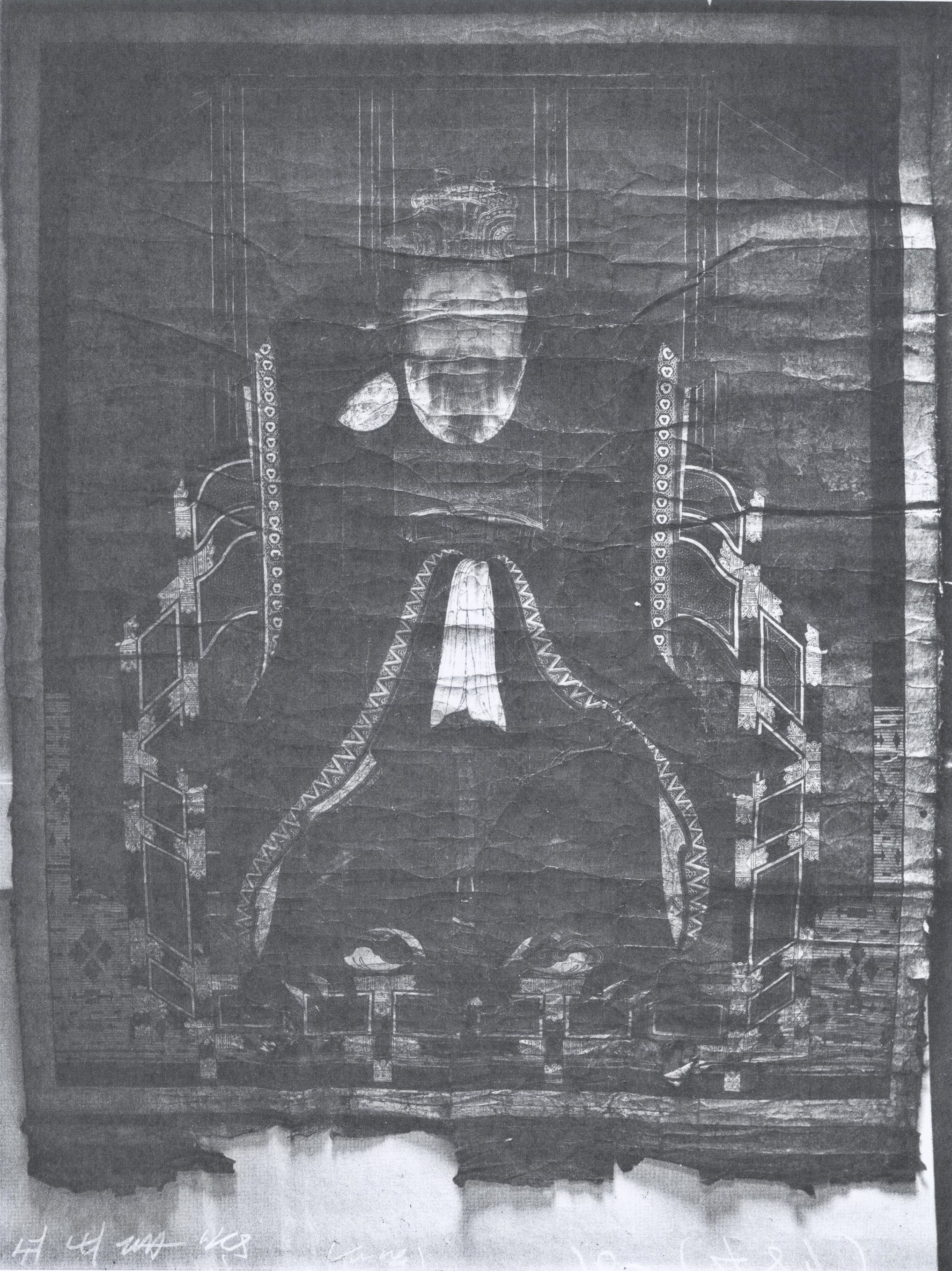

King of Goryeo
- Reign: 1351–1374
- Coronation: 1351
- Predecessor: Chungjeong of Goryeo
- Successor: U of Goryeo
- Born: Wang Gi; 23 May 1330
- Died: 27 October 1374 (aged 44)
- Burial: Hyeolleung tomb
- Spouse: Queen Indeok (m. 1349; died 1365)
- Consort: Lady Han (m. 1357) Lady Yi (m. 1359) Lady Wang (m. 1366) Lady An (m. 1366) Lady Yeom (m. 1371)
- Issue: U of Goryeo
Names
- Goryeo: Wang Gi (왕기; 王祺), later Wang Jeon (왕전; 王顓); Yuan: Bayan Temür (바얀테무르/백안첩목아, 伯顔帖木兒)
Posthumous name
- King Inmun Uimu Yongji Myeongyeol Gyeonghyo the Great (인문의무용지명열경효대왕, 仁文義武勇智明烈敬孝大王; given by Goryeo); King Gongmin (공민왕, 恭愍王; given by Ming)
- House: Wang
- Father: Chungsuk of Goryeo
- Mother: Queen Gongwon
- Religion: Buddhism

Korean name
- Hangul: 왕전
- Hanja: 王顓
- RR: Wang Jeon
- MR: Wang Chŏn

Monarch name
- Hangul: 공민왕
- Hanja: 恭愍王
- RR: Gongminwang
- MR: Kongminwang

Art name
- Hangul: 이재, 익당
- Hanja: 怡齋, 益堂
- RR: Ijae, Ikdang
- MR: Ijae, Iktang

Courtesy name
- Hangul: 원량
- Hanja: 元良
- RR: Wonryang
- MR: Wŏllyang

Former name
- Hangul: 왕기
- Hanja: 王祺
- RR: Wang Gi
- MR: Wang Ki

Gongmin (Korean: 공민; Hanja: 恭愍; 23 May 1330 – 27 October 1374), also known by his Mongolian name, Bayan Temür, was 31st ruler of Goryeo from 1351 to 1374. He was the second son of King Chungsuk.

== Biography ==
=== Early life ===
Goryeo had been a semi-autonomous vassal state under the overlordship of the Mongol Yuan dynasty since the Mongol invasions of Korea in the 13th century. Starting with King Chungnyeol, prospective rulers of Korea married Mongolian princesses and were customarily sent to the Yuan Court, in effect, as hostages. As per this custom, King Gongmin spent many years in the Yuan court, being sent there in 1341, before ascending the Korean throne. He married a Mongolian princess who became Queen Indeok. The Yuan dynasty began to crumble during the mid-14th century, and was eventually conquered and replaced by the Ming dynasty in 1368.

=== Reign ===
With the disintegration of Yuan, which had forcibly allied the Korean peninsula since the 40 year long Mongol invasion of Korea of 1238, King Gongmin began efforts to reform Goryeo government. His first act was to remove all pro-Mongol aristocrats and military officers from their positions. These deposed people formed a dissident faction which plotted an unsuccessful coup against the king. High official Cho Il-sin even tried to take over the government, but this rebellion was put down by general Ch'oe Yŏng.

During the Mongol invasions of Korea, between the 1250s and the 1270s, the Mongols annexed the northern provinces of Korea and incorporated them into their empire as Ssangseong and Dongnyeong Prefectures. In 1356, the Goryeo army retook these provinces partly thanks to the defection of Yi Cha-ch'un, a minor Korean official in the service of the Mongols in Ssangseong, and his son, Yi Sŏng-gye. In addition, Generals Yi Sŏng-gye and Chi Yong-su led a campaign into Liaoyang.

Another issue was the question of land holdings. The land-grant system had broken down, and Mongol-favoured officials, along with a handful of landed gentry, owned the vast majority of agricultural landholdings, which were worked by tenant farmers and bondsmen. However, King Gongmin's attempt at land reform was met with opposition and subterfuge from officials who were supposed to implement his reforms, as they were landowners themselves.

The Wokou (Japanese pirates) were also a problem during King Gongmin's reign. Initially starting as 'hit-and-run' bandits, the Wokou evolved into well-organized military marauders raiding deep into the interior. Generals Ch'oe Yŏng and Yi Sŏng-gye were tasked to combat them.

Additionally, King Gongmin grappled with the Red Turban troops, who invaded Goryeo twice during his reign (first in 1359 and again in 1361). In 1361, the Red Turban troops occupied Kaesong for a short period of time. After Kaesong was recaptured by Generals Ch'oe Yŏng, Yi Sŏng-gye, Chŏng Se-un, and Yi Pang-sil, few Red Turban troops escaped with their lives.

During the reign of King Gongmin, a Goryeo diplomat, Mun Ikchŏm, stationed in China, managed to smuggle cotton seeds into Goryeo, introducing cotton cultivation to the Korean peninsula.

Although the relationship between Princess Noguk and the king was very close, they failed to conceive an heir for many years. Despite suggestions of taking a second wife, King Gongmin ignored these requests. The king was also known to have entered into pederastic relationships with several court catamites, or chajewi, and the names of five of these are recorded as: Hong Yun, Han An, Kwon Chin, Hong Kwan, and No Son. Princess Noguk became pregnant but died from complications with childbirth in 1365. Her death led to King Gongmin's depression and mental instability. King Gongmin became indifferent to politics and entrusted the great tasks of state to Pyeonjo, a Buddhist monk who was born as the son of a princess and a slave. Judging him as clever, King Gongmin renamed Pyeonjo as Sin Ton. Having the full confidence of King Gongmin, Sin Ton tried to reform the society of Goryeo. In 1365, King Gongmin gave Pyeonjo the nickname "Cheonghan Geosa" and the noble title of Jinpyeonghu (Chinpyŏng Marquess). After six years, Sin Ton lost his position, and King Gongmin had him executed in 1371. During his visits, the king had grown close to one of Sin Ton's servants, Banya, with whom he had a son named Monino in 1365. After Sin Ton's death, the boy was proclaimed heir apparent and it was claimed that his mother was a deceased palace maid.

Goryeo's entrenched bureaucracy never forgave King Gongmin for his reform efforts. They interpreted his policy of cutting all ties with the Yuan and establishing relations with Ming China as a direct threat to their status and feared that further attempts at reform might follow. Kaesong's deposed pro-Mongol faction battled to protect its position and hoped to renew ties with the Mongols.

=== Death ===
The details of King Gongmin's reign and the circumstances surrounding his death are recorded in Goryeosa, the history of the Joseon period. The account of his murder may have been colored by the fact that the Goryeosa was intended to legitimize the succeeding dynasty by demonstrating the moral failures of the previous one, but there is no alternative historical record to counter the Goryeosa account. According to an entry for the first day of the tenth lunar month in the twenty-first year of the reign of King Gongmin - in the forty-third volume of Goryeosa, the sixth Book of King Gongmin — in 1372 King Gongmin formed an elite group of young men called the Jajewi ('Noble Youth Guards'), selected from among the most promising sons of the nobility. Ostensibly, the Jajewi was organized so that Gongmin himself could instruct these young men and groom them as the next generation of loyal government ministers. However, the record goes on to recount that Gongmin had become mentally unbalanced after the death of his first wife, and though he had four consorts, he rarely visited them and was impotent. The members of Jajewi were selected, not for their virtues, but for their youthful beauty and perverted dispositions, to become the King's intimate companions.

The record goes on to say that the King ordered the men of the Jajewi to have relations with his consorts, in order to produce a male child that he could claim as his own. When three of the consorts, Jung, Hye, and Sin refused and threatened to commit suicide if they were violated, the King personally took several of the Jajewi men, including Hong Ryun (홍륜) and Han An (한안), to the chamber of Consort Ik and frightened her into complying by threatening her with his sword. After this, the men often went to her chamber at night under the pretext of fulfilling the King's order.

It is written in the Life of Hong Ryon (Hong Ryun) that two years later, on the night of the murder at the twenty-first day of the ninth lunar month in the twenty-third year of the reign of King Gongmin (1374 C.E.), the eunuch Ch'oe Man-saeng (최만생) reported to King Gongmin that Consort Ik was in her fifth month of pregnancy. The King was greatly pleased by this, and asked who the father was. When he learned that it was Hong Ryun (홍륜), he told the eunuch that he would now have to kill him and the entire group of Jajewi men in order to keep the secret of her baby's paternity.

That same night, at the royal palace in Songdo, several men entered the King's private chamber in the middle of the night and butchered him with swords. Though at least three people shouted, "enemy has entered," the palace guards dared not make a move, and the royal servants refused to come out of their rooms. Immediately after the murder, a court eunuch named Yi Kang-tal and the high ministers Gyung Bouheung, Yi In-im, and An Sagi, conducted an inquiry, discovered Ch'oe Man-saeng still wearing clothes stained with Gongmin's blood, and extracted a confession from him. He named five members of the elite Jajewi, including Hong Ryun, as his accomplices. All six were executed, their fathers put in prison, their children hanged, their families' properties confiscated, and their brothers and uncles flogged and sent into exile. Mercy was shown only to the wives, who were allowed to live on as palace slaves.

After his death, a high official Yi In-im assumed the helm of the government and enthroned eleven-year-old King U.

== Worship ==
In Korean shamanism, Gongmin is worshiped as one of Wangshin (Korean: 왕신; Hanja: 王神; lit. 'King god').

== As an artist ==
King Gongmin was well known for his artistic skills, and he is referred to as one of the best artists of the Goryeo period. He was also well known for his calligraphy works.

Example of his works are:

- "Painting of A Hunt in the Mountains of Heaven" 《天山大獵圖 (천산대렵도 Cheonsan Daeryeop Do)》
- "Painting of Two Sheep" 《二羊圖 (이양도 I Yang Do)》
- "Portrait of Princess Noguk" 《魯國大長公主真 (노국대장공주진 Noguk Daejang Gongju Jin)》
- "Portrait of Yeom Je-shin 《廉悌臣象 (염제신상 Yeom Je-shin Sang)》, 1370's
- "Portrait of Sohn Hong-ryang" 《孫洪亮象 (손홍량상 Sohn Hong-ryang Sang)》
- "Portrait of Śākyamuni's Leaving Mountain" 《釋迦出山像 (석가출산상 Seokga Chulsan Sang)》
- "Landscape of Epang Palace" 《阿房宮圖 (아방궁도 Ahbanggung Do)》
- "Landscape of Hyeonneung" 《玄陵山水圖 (현릉산수도 Hyeonreung Sansu Do)》
- "Portrait of Bodhidharma Crossing a River with a Broken Branch" 《達磨折蘆渡江圖 (달마절로도강도 Dalma Jeollo Dogang Do)》
- Dongjabohyeon Yugabaeksang Do《童子普賢六牙白象圖 (동자보현육아백상도)》
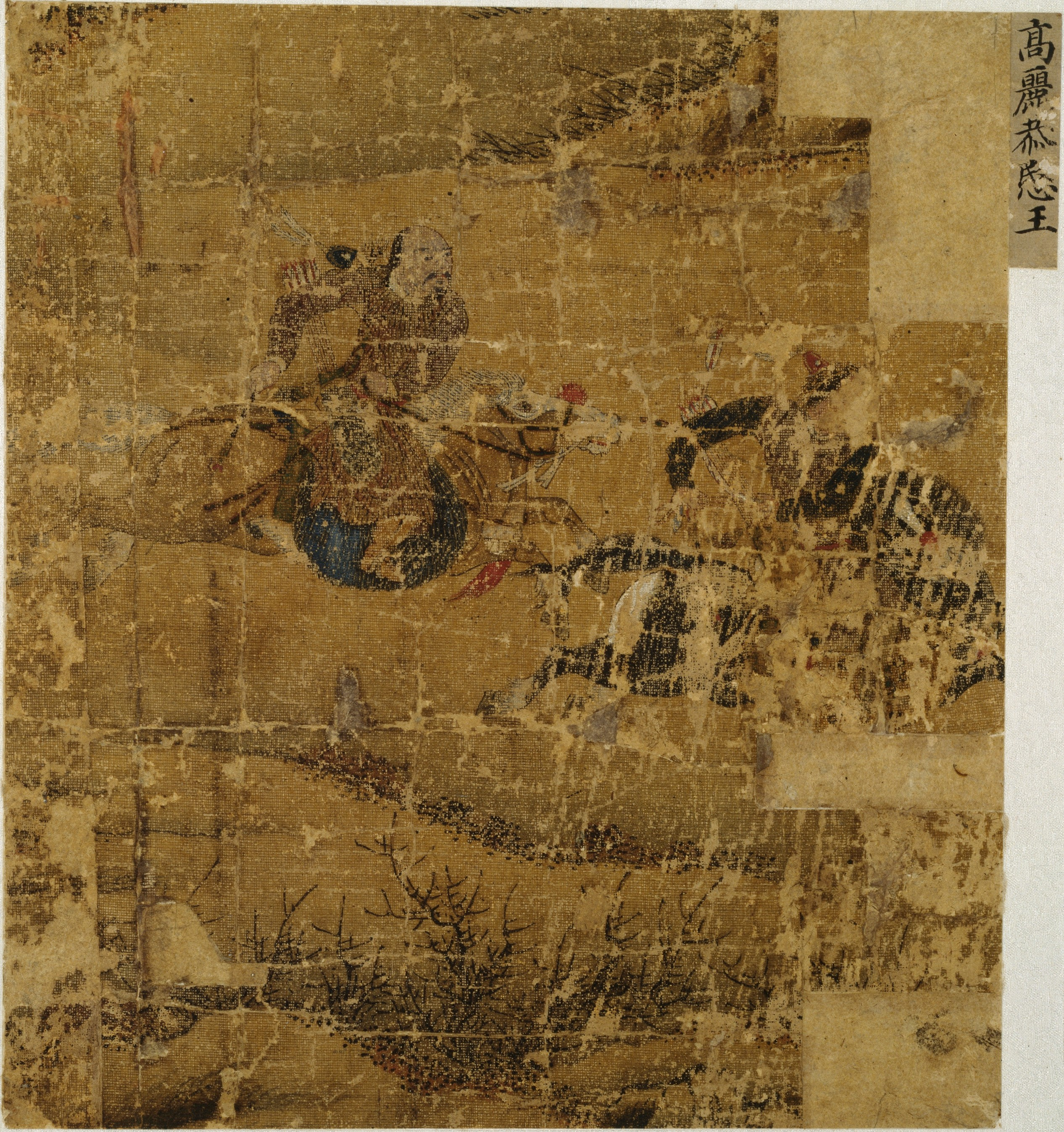
Cheonsan Daeryeop Do, "Portrait of A Hunt in the Mountains of Heaven".

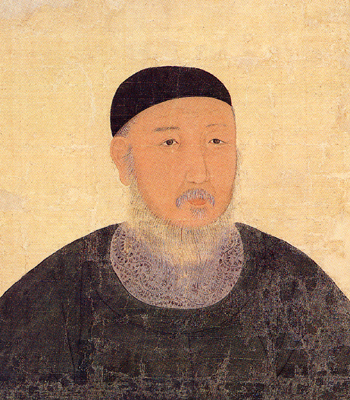
Yeon Je-shin's Portrait, painted by King Gongmin around the 1370s.

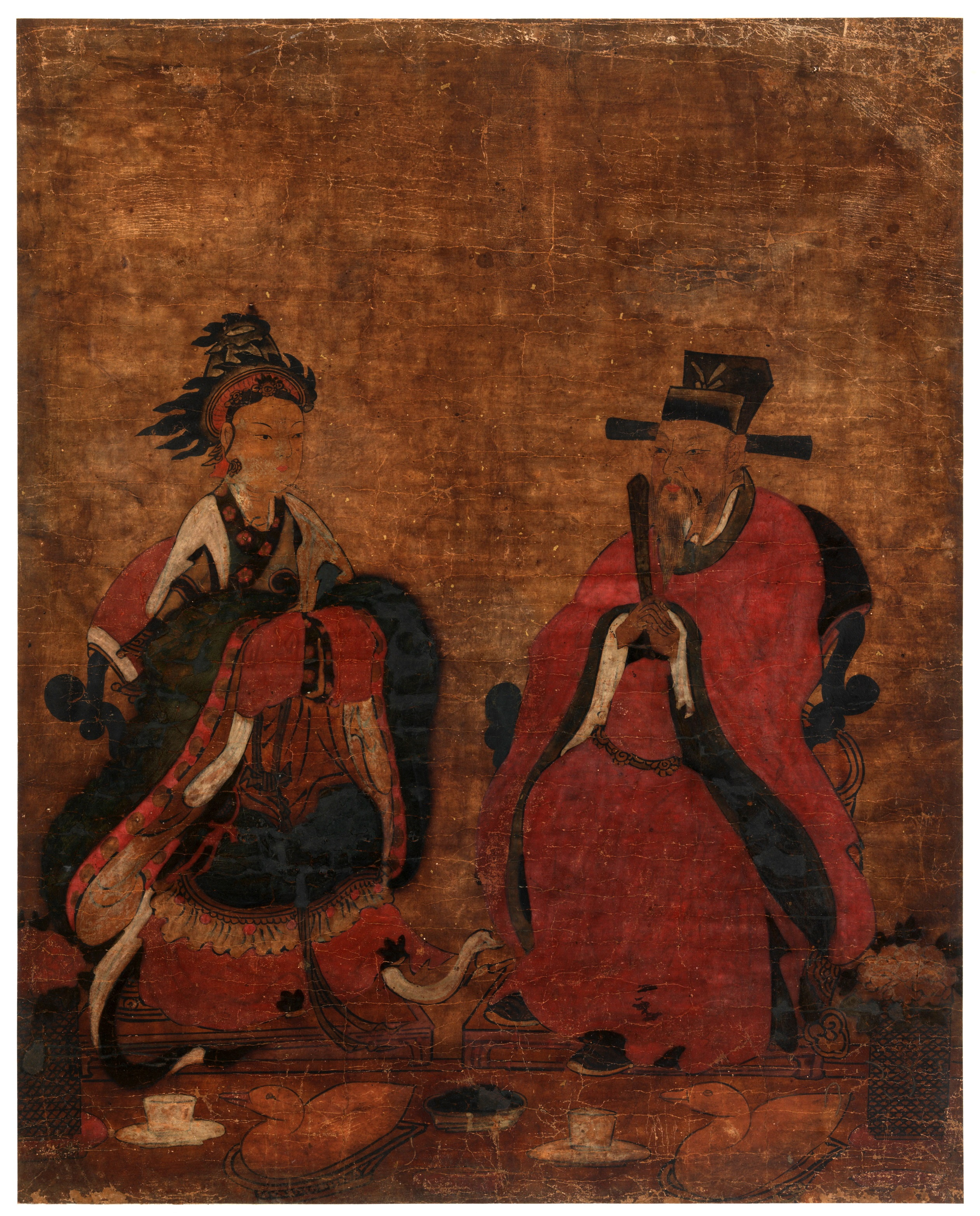
King Gongmin and Princess Noguk

== Family ==
- Father: Chungsuk of Goryeo
  - Grandfather: Chungseon of Goryeo
  - Grandmother: Consort Ui
- Mother: Queen Gongwon of the Namyang Hong clan
  - Grandfather: Hong Gyu
  - Grandmother: Grand Lady of Samhan State of the Gwangju Kim clan (삼한국대부인 광주 김씨)

Consorts and their Respective Issue(s):

1. Queen Indeok of the Yuan Borjigin clan, personal name Budashiri.
  1. 1st son (1365), died after birth.
2. Royal Consort Hye of the Gyeongju Yi clan – No issue.
3. Royal Consort Ik of the Kaeseong Wang clan – No issue.
4. Royal Consort Jeong of the Juksan An clan – No issue.
5. Royal Consort Sin of the Paju Yeom clan – No issue.
6. Queen Sunjeong of the Goksan Han clan – No issue.
7. Lady Ban-Ya
  1. Crown Prince Wang U, 2nd son

== Popular depictions ==
- Portrayed by Im Hyuk in the 1983 KBS TV series Foundation of the Kingdom.
- Portrayed by Jeong Bo-seok in the 2005–2006 MBC TV series Shin Don.
- Portrayed by Joo Jin-mo in the 2008 film A Frozen Flower.
- Portrayed by Ryu Deok-hwan in the 2012 SBS TV series Faith.
- Portrayed by Ryu Tae-joon in the 2012–2013 SBS TV series The Great Seer.
- Portrayed by Kim Myeong-su in the 2014 KBS TV series Jeong Do-jeon.

== See also ==
- History of Korea
- List of Korean monarchs
- Tomb of King Kongmin
- Korea under Yuan rule

Gongmin of Goryeo House of Wang Born: 23 May 1330 Died: 27 October 1374
Regnal titles
Preceded by King Chungjeong	King of Goryeo; 1351–1374	Succeeded by King U
