= Sin Ton =

Korean Buddhist monk (1322–1371)

- Born: 21 January 1322; Yeongsan-hyeon, Gyeongsang Province, Goryeo
- Died: 21 August 1371 (aged 48); Suju, Gyeonggi Province, Goryeo
- Cause of death: Execution
- Occupations: Buddhist monk; warrior; politician; writer; scholar
- Title: Marquis Jinpyeong
- Children: 1
- Parents: Sin Won-gyeong (father); Lady Park (adoptive mother)
- Family: Yeongsan Sin clan

Korean name
- Hangul: 신돈
- Hanja: 辛旽
- RR: Sin Don
- MR: Sin Ton

Art name
- Hangul: 청한거사
- Hanja: 淸閑居士
- RR: Cheonghangeosa
- MR: Ch'ŏnghan'gŏsa

Courtesy name
- Hangul: 요공
- Hanja: 耀空
- RR: Yogong
- MR: Yogong

Dharma name
- Hangul: 편조
- Hanja: 遍照
- RR: Pyeonjo
- MR: P'yŏnjo

Sin Ton (Korean: 신돈; 21 January 1322 – 21 August 1371) (Note: According to the Korean calendar (lunisolar), Sin Ton died on the 11th day of the 7th month of 1371.) was a Korean Buddhist monk and scholar during the Goryeo period. His Dharma name was P'yŏnjo (편조) and he became a teacher and advisor of King Gongmin.

== Biography ==
He was a Buddhist monk with the full confidence of King Gongmin, and who tried to reform the society of Goryeo. The king judged Sin Ton cleverness; in 1365, he gave him the art name Cheonghan Geosa (청한거사; 淸閑居士) and the noble title of Marquis Jinpyeong (진평후; 真平侯).

Sin Ton appointed a group of new high-level officials from the Sinjin faction of the scholar-officials and drove out some people who had acquired too much power. He also promoted the setting up of the Jeonmin Byeonjeong Dogam (전민변정도감; 田民辨整都監), a government office to reform the land in 1366; thus, he was met with the opposition of the powerful old aristocratic families. While surrounded by flatterers, he didn't have any supporters. Finally, King Gongmin executed Sin Ton in 1371.

== Criticism ==
King Gongmin's attempt to regain the leadership of the state through the introduction of Sin Ton had achieved some success. However, for this purpose, King Gongmin had almost entrusted Sin Ton with full authority, and had to face criticism for allowing Sin Ton to be an equal to the monarch.

== In popular culture ==
- Portrayed by Son Chang-min in the 2005–2006 MBC TV series Shin Don.
- Portrayed by Yoo Ha-joon in the 2012–2013 SBS TV series The Great Seer.

== See also ==
- Yi Che-hyŏn
- Gongmin of Goryeo
- U of Goryeo
