= Queen Inpyeong =

Queen Inpyeong 인평왕후

Queen consort of Goryeo
- Tenure: ?–?
- Predecessor: Queen Yongmok
- Successor: Queen Inye
- Spouse: Munjong of Goryeo
Posthumous name
- Inpyeong (인평, 仁平; "Benevolent and Peaceful")
- House: Ansan Kim (official); Wang (agnatic and by marriage)
- Father: Hyeonjong of Goryeo
- Mother: Queen Wonseong
- Religion: Buddhism

Queen Inpyeong of the Ansan Kim clan (Korean: 인평왕후 김씨; Hanja: 仁平王后 金氏) was a Goryeo princess as the first and oldest daughter of King Hyeonjong and Queen Wonseong, also the first younger sister of King Deokjong and King Jeongjong who became a queen consort through her marriage with her half older brother, King Munjong as his first and primary wife. She was the tenth Goryeo queen who took her maternal surname after Queen Gyeongseong, her half-sister.

== Family ==
- Father: Hyeonjong of Goryeo
- Mother: Queen Wonseong
    - Older brother: Deokjong of Goryeo
    - Older brother: Jeongjong of Goryeo
    - Younger sister: Princess Gyeongsuk (경숙공주)
- Husband and half-brother: Munjong of Goryeo – No issue.
