= Consort Choe =

Consort Choe may refer to:

- Lady Yeonchang (fl. 10th century), Seongjong of Goryeo's consort
- Queen Wonhwa (fl. 1010s), Hyeonjong of Goryeo's consort
- Queen Jangseon (fl. 1148), Uijong of Goryeo's consort
- Princess Jangsin (died 1184), Yejong of Goryeo's consort
- Choe Yong-deok (died after 1388), U of Goryeo's consort
- Consort Yeongbi Choe (died after 1389), U of Goryeo's consort
- Royal Noble Consort Gongbin Choe (fl. 1462), Yejong of Joseon's consort
- Royal Noble Consort Sukbin Choe (1670–1718), Sukjong of Joseon's consort

== See also ==
- Queen Jeongsuk (fl. 14th century), great-grandmother of Taejo of Joseon
- Queen Uihye (died before 1392), mother of Taejo of Joseon
