= Royal Consort Wonsun Suk-Bi =

11th-century Korean consort

Pure Consort Wonsun 원순숙비
- Died: before 1055; Goryeo
- Spouse: Hyeonjong of Goryeo (before 1024)
- Issue: Queen Gyeongseong
Posthumous name
- Wonsun (원순, 元順; "Primary and Obedience")
- House: Gyeongju Kim clan
- Father: Kim In-wi

Pure Consort Wonsun of the Gyeongju Kim clan (Korean: 원순숙비 김씨; Hanja: 元順淑妃 金氏) or before called as Mistress Gyeongheungwon (경흥원주; 景興院主; lit. 'Mistress of Gyeongheung Courtyard') was a Korean Royal Consort as the 8th wife of King Hyeonjong of Goryeo and the mother of Queen Gyeongseong.

== Biography ==
=== Early life and background ===
She was born into the Gyeongju Kim clan as the daughter of Kim In-wi (김인위; 金因渭). Her sister would become Yi Ja-yeon's wife and the mother of the future Queen Inye, Consort Ingyeong, and Consort Injeol.

=== Palace life ===
Although she was unknown when she first entered the palace, she was initially honoured as Primary Lady Gyeongheung (경흥원주; 景興院主) and given the Gyeongheung Residence (경흥원; 景興院) as her manor. In 1024 (15th year reign of Hyeonjong of Goryeo), she was given a consort's royal title, Deok-Bi (덕비; 德妃; lit. 'Virtuous Consort'). Meanwhile, her father was given a royal government position and received 300 Sik-eup (식읍 300호).

With King Hyeonjong of Goryeo, she had one child, a daughter. Their daughter married her own half-brother, King Deokjong and was posthumously known as "Queen Gyeongseong" (경성왕후).

=== Funeral ===
Her death date was unrecorded in Goryeosa, the main surviving text on the Goryeo period. In 1057 (11th year reign of King Munjong) however, Queen Wonmok recorded that it was said that Munjong and his ministers were discussed the deceased Queen Wonmok's funeral, alongside buried Lady Kim and Wonmok based on the example of Queen Munhwa, which Kim was presumed to die before 1055.

Even though her tomb is unknown, she was later known posthumously as Pure Consort Wonsun (원순숙비; 元順淑妃).
