= Princess Yeonheung =

Princess Yeonheung (Korean: 연흥궁주; Hanja: 延興宮主) may refer to these Goryeo consorts:

- Queen Wonjeong (died 1018), first wife of Hyeonjong
- Queen Munhwa (died 1029?), second wife of Seongjong
- Queen Yongsin (died 1036), first wife of Jeongjong
- Royal Consort Yongjeol Deok-Bi (died 1102), fourth wife of Jeongjong
