= Queen Wonseong =

Korean queen (fl. 11th century)

Queen Wonseong 원성왕후
- Grand Queen Mother Wonseong (원성왕태후; 元成王太后)

Queen consort of Goryeo
- Tenure: 1022 – 15 August 1028
- Coronation: 1022
- Predecessor: Queen Wonhwa
- Successor: Royal Consort Gyeongmok
- Born: 995; Jangsang-dong, Sangrok-gu, Ansan, Gyeonggi Province, Goryeo
- Died: 15 August 1028 (aged 33); Goryeo
- Burial: Myeongneung tomb
- Spouse: Hyeonjong of Goryeo (m. 1011–1028)
- Issue: Deokjong of Goryeo; Jeongjong of Goryeo; Queen Inpyeong; Princess Gyeongsuk
Regnal name
- Primary Lady Yeongyeong (Korean: 연경원주; Hanja: 延慶院主; from 1016); Princess Yeongyeong (Korean: 연경궁주; Hanja: 延慶宮主; from 1018)
Posthumous name
- Grand Queen Mother Wonseong Yongui Gonghye Yeongmok Yangdeok Sinjeol Sunseong Jaseong Gwangseon 원성용의공혜영목양덕신절순성자성광선왕태후 (元成容懿恭惠英穆良德信節順聖慈聖廣宣王太后)
- House: Ansan Kim clan
- Father: Kim Un-bu
- Mother: Lady Yi, of the Gyeongwon Yi clan
- Religion: Buddhism

Queen Wonseong of the Ansan Kim clan (Korean: 원성왕후 김씨; Hanja: 元成王后 金氏; 995 – 15 August 1028 (Note: In the Korean calendar (lunisolar), she died on 22nd day of the 7th month of 1028.)) or formally called as Grand Queen Mother Wonseong (원성왕태후; 元成王太后) was a Korean queen consort as the 3rd wife of King Hyeonjong of Goryeo who became the mother of his successors, Deokjong and Jeongjong.

She was born into the Ansan Kim clan as the eldest daughter of Kim Unbu and Lady Yi, daughter of Yi Hogyom (이허겸) from the Gyeongwon Yi clan. Kim Unbu was an influential royal court favorite and official. In 1010, King Hyeonjong who had fled to Naju, Jeolla Province due to the Khitan's invasion, stayed overnight in Gongju, South Chungcheong Province at Kim Unbu's house and Kim welcomed him with made his eldest daughter serve Hyeonjong comfortably. It was said too that Lady Kim made and dedicated clothes to Hyeonjong own. After this, Unbu's two other daughters also married to Hyeonjong.

According to Goryeosa, she firstly entered the palace in 1011 and was honoured as Primary Lady Yeongyeong (연경원주; 延慶院主) not long after bearing her eldest son, Wang Heum in 1016. Then, she was given the "Yeongyeong Palace" (연경궁; 延慶宮) and became Princess Yeongyeong (연경궁주; 延慶宮主) after bearing her second son, Wang Hyeong in 1018. Beside Heum and Hyeong, she also had two other daughters from Hyeonjong. In 1022, she formally became a Queen consort and in 1027 stayed in "Janggyeong Palace" (장경궁; 長慶宮). However, she eventually died a year later and was buried in Myeongneung tomb (명릉; 明陵); she was later enshrined in her husband's shrine.

== Family ==
- Father: Kim Un-bu (d. 11 June 1017)
  - Grandfather: Kim Kŭng-pil (김긍필; 金兢弼)
    - 1st Older brother: Kim Chung-chan (김충찬, 金忠贊; d. July 1036)
    - 2nd Older brother: Kim Nan-won (김난원, 金爛圓; 1055–1101)
    - 1st Younger sister: Queen Wonhye (d. 1022)
    - 2nd Younger sister: Queen Wonpyeong (d. 1028)
- Mother: Grand Lady of Ansan County of the Gyeongwon Yi clan (안산군대부인 인천 이씨); formally called as "Grand Lady of the Anhyo State" (안효국대부인; 安孝國大夫人)
  - Grandfather: Yi Ho-gyom (이허겸; 李許謙) – the founder of the Gyeongwon Yi clan.
  - Grandmother: Grand Lady of Ansan County of the Gyeongju Kim clan (안산군대부인 경주 김씨)
- Husband: King Hyeonjong of Goryeo (992–1031)
  - 1st son: King Deokjong of Goryeo (1016–1034)
  - 2nd son: King Jeongjong of Goryeo (1018–1046)
  - 1st daughter: Queen Inpyeong
  - 2nd daughter: Princess Gyeongsuk (경숙공주)

== Posthumous name ==
- After King Deokjong's ascension to the throne in 1031, he honoured his late mother as Grand Queen Mother (왕태후; 王太后) and gave her a posthumous name as Yong-ui (용의; 容懿) and Gong-hye (공혜; 恭惠).
- In October 1056 (10th year reign of King Munjong), name Yeong-mok (영목; 英穆); Yang-deok (양덕; 良德); Sin-jeol (신절; 信節); and Sun-seong (순성; 順聖) was added.
- In April 1140 (18th year reign of King Injong), name Ja-seong (자성; 慈聖) was added.
- In October 1253 (40th year reign of King Gojong), name Gwang-seon (광선; 廣宣) was added to her posthumous name too.

== In popular culture ==
- Portrayed by Jung Han-bi in the 2009 KBS2 TV series Empress Cheonchu.
- Portrayed by Ha Seung-ri in the 2023–2024 KBS2 TV series Korea-Khitan War.
