= Queen Wonpyeong =

Korean queen (fl. 11th century)

Queen Wonpyeong 원평왕후
- Born: 1005; Jangsang-dong, Sangrok-gu, Ansan, Gyeonggi Province, Goryeo
- Died: Unknown; Goryeo
- Burial: Uireung tomb
- Spouse: Hyeonjong of Goryeo (m. 1022)
- Issue: Princess Hyogyeong
Posthumous name
- Wonpyeong (원평, 元平; "Primary and Peaceful")
- House: Ansan Kim clan
- Father: Kim Un-bu
- Mother: Lady Yi of the Gyeongwon Yi clan

Queen Wonpyeong of the Ansan Kim clan (Korean: 원평왕후 김씨; Hanja: 元平王后 金氏; 1005–?) was the 7th wife of King Hyeonjong of Goryeo and the youngest among his third and fourth wife. As well as the younger sister of Queen Wonhye and Queen Wonseong.

She was born into the Ansan Kim clan as the youngest daughter of Kim Un-bu and Lady Yi, daughter of Yi Ho-gyom (이허겸) from the Gyeongwon Yi clan. Her father, Kim Unbu, was a person who passionately supported Hyeonjong when he fled from the pursuing Khitans, so Hyeonjong reciprocated it by forging ties with the Ansan Kim clan. For this reason, Kim Un-bu's youngest daughter received considerable respect.

In 1022 (13th year of the reign of King Hyeonjong), after the death of her second older sister, Queen Wonseong, Kim entered the palace and became Hyeonjong's seventh wife. They then had a daughter, Princess Hyogyeong (효경공주) in 1026. Although her death date was unknown, it seems that she died around 1028 or before since she received her posthumous name "Wonpyeong" (원평; 元平) in 1028 and buried in Uireung Tomb (의릉; 宜陵).
