= Princess Hyeondeok =

Princess Hyeondeok may refer to these Goryeo consorts:

- Queen Munhwa (died 1029?), second wife of Seongjong
- Queen Yongui (died after 1040), second wife of Jeongjong
