= Queen Wonhye =

Korean noblewoman (fl. 11th century)

- Born: 1000; Goryeo
- Died: 31 July 1022 (aged 21–22); Goryeo
- Burial: Hoereung tomb
- Spouse: Hyeonjong of Goryeo (m. 1011–1022)
- Issue: Munjong of Goryeo; King Jeonggan; Queen Hyosa
Posthumous name
- Wonhye (원혜, 元惠; "Primary and Kind"): Given by King Hyeonjong of Goryeo: Princess Wonhye Yeondeok (원혜연덕궁주; 元惠延德宮主; given in 1022); Princess Consort (Queen) Wonhye (원혜왕비; 元惠王妃; given in 1025); Queen Pyeonggyeong (평경왕후; 平敬王后; given in 1027); Queen Pyeonggyeong Wonhye (평경원혜왕후; 平敬元惠王后; given in 1027); Given by King Munjong of Goryeo: Queen Mother Wonhye (원혜태후; 元惠太后); Queen Mother Pyeonggyeong Wonhye (평경원혜태후; 平敬元惠太后)
- House: Ansan Kim clan
- Father: Kim Un-bu
- Mother: Lady Yi, of the Gyeongwon Yi clan

Queen Wonhye of the Ansan Kim clan (Korean: 원혜왕후 김씨; Hanja: 元惠王后 金氏; 1000 – 31 July 1022 (Note: In the Korean calendar (lunisolar), she died on 30th day of the 6th month of 1022.)), posthumously and commonly known as Queen Mother Wonhye (원혜태후; 元惠太后) was the 4th wife of King Hyeonjong of Goryeo, younger sister of Queen Wonseong and elder sister of Queen Wonpyeong.

== Biography ==
She was born into the Ansan Kim clan as the second daughter of Kim Un-bu and Lady Yi, daughter of Yi Ho-gyom (이허겸) from the Gyeongwon Yi clan. Alongside her elder sister, she entered King Hyeonjong's palace around 1011 CE. She was honoured as Princess Anbok (Korean: 안복궁주; Hanja: 安福宮主) while living in Anbok Palace (안복궁; 安福宮). This later changed into Princess Yeondeok (연덕궁주; 延德宮主) when she moved to Yeondeok Palace (연덕궁; 延德宮).

== Death and legacy ==
In 1022, the 13th year of her husband's reign, Lady Kim died after giving birth to her only daughter. Three years later in 1025, she was posthumously honoured as a queen consort. She was also honoured as Queen Pyeonggyeong (평경왕후; 平敬王后) in 1027 and buried in Hoereung Tomb (회릉; 懷陵).

After her eldest son ascended the throne as King Munjong, Lady Kim became honored as a queen dowager. Beside Munjong, she bore a son and a daughter, whom would marry King Deokjong.
