= Queen Yongmok =

Goryeo queen (fl. 11th century)

Queen Yongmok 용목왕후

Queen consort of Goryeo
- Tenure: ?–?
- Predecessor: Queen Yongui
- Successor: Queen Inpyeong
- Born: ? Buyeo, Chungcheong Province, Goryeo
- Spouse: Jeongjong of Goryeo
- Issue: Princess Doae
Posthumous name
- Yongmok (용목, 容穆; "Tolerant and Majestic")
- House: possibly Buyeo Yi (by birth); House of Wang (by marriage)
- Father: Yi Pum-eon (이품언)
- Religion: Buddhism

Queen Yongmok of the Yi clan (Korean: 용목왕후 이씨; Hanja: 容穆王后 李氏) was a Korean queen consort as the third wife of Jeongjong of Goryeo while her sister became Deokjong of Goryeo's fourth wife. As a queen, she lived in Changseong Palace (창성궁; 昌盛宮) and bore Jeongjong a daughter, Princess Doae.
