= Wang Kyŏng =

Wang Kyŏng may refer to:

- Marquess Nangnang (fl. 1052), Jeongjong of Goryeo's son
- Marquess Daeryeong (1130–?), Injong of Goryeo's son
