= Queen Wonmok =

Korean queen (fl. 11th century)

Queen Wonmok 원목왕후
- Born: 998; Goryeo
- Died: 16 June 1057 (aged 59); Goryeo
- Spouse: Hyeonjong of Goryeo (m. 1022; died 1031)
Regnal name
- Pure Consort (숙비; 淑妃; from 1022); Princess Heungseong (흥성궁주; 興盛宮主)
Posthumous name
- Wonmok (원목, 元穆; "Primary and Majestic")
- House: Icheon Sŏ clan
- Father: Sŏ Nul
- Mother: Lady Ch'oe

Queen Wonmok of the Icheon Sŏ clan (Korean: 원목왕후 서씨; Hanja: 元穆王后 徐氏; 998 – 16 June 1057 (Note: In the Korean calendar (lunisolar), she died on 12th day of the 5th month of 1028.)) was the granddaughter of Sŏ Hŭi and the 6th wife of King Hyeonjong of Goryeo.

== Biography ==
The future Queen Wonmok was born in 998 into the Icheon Sŏ clan as the daughter of Sŏ Nul (서눌) and Lady Ch'oe (최씨) She had a younger brother, Sŏ Su (서수; 徐琇) whom his descendants later held a noble position in the Goryeo Royal court.

=== Palace life ===
In 1022 (13th year reign of Hyeonjong of Goryeo), she firstly entered the palace and honoured as Suk-Bi (숙비; 淑妃; lit. 'Pure Consort') and given a Royal title of Princess Heungseong (흥성궁주; 興盛宮主) while lived in "Heungseong Palace" (흥성궁; 興盛宮). In the same year, her father, Seo Nul held positions such as Jungchusahsangisangsi (중추사우산기상시; 中樞使右散騎常侍) and Seogyeongyusupansa (서경유수판사; 署經留守判事), also during King Deokjong's reign, Seo Nul became Munhasijung (문하시중; 門下侍中).

Then, in 1026, Hyeonjong gave her biological mother, Lady Choe a title of "Grand Lady of Icheon County" (이천군대부인; 利川郡大夫人) and her stepmother, Lady Jeong a title of "Grand Lady of Icheon County" (이천군대군; 利川郡大君).

=== Later life, Death and funeral ===
She outlived at least 26 years since her late husband's death in 1031 and later died on 16 June 1057 during the 11th year reign of her stepson, King Munjong. Although she was also one of the king's stepmother, but since she didn't have her own child, so many Ministers in the court told Munjong to not wear the "Sang-bok" (상복, 喪服; "mourning clothes") and he followed it as a result. For the same reason, her ancestral rites were not held on the New Year's Day.

Her body was cremated, but where her tomb's location is unknown since no records left about that. Under his command too, she was posthumously called as Queen Wonmok (원목왕후; 元穆王后).

== Family ==
- Father - Sŏ Nul (서눌, 徐訥; 972–1043)
  - Grandfather - Sŏ Hŭi (서희, 徐熙; 943–998)
  - Grandmother - Lady Han of the Cheongju Han clan (청주 한씨; 947–?); daughter of Han Sik (한식, 韓湜; 921–?)
- Mother - Princess Consort Incheon of the Ch'oe clan (이천부부인 최씨; 974–?); daughter of Ch'oe Yu-il (최유일, 崔有一; 948–?)
- Sibling(s)
  - Older brother - Sŏ Su (서수; 996–?)
    - Unnamed sister-in-law (1000–?)
      - Nephew - Sŏ Chang-gi (서장기, 徐長己; 1024–?)
- Spouse
  - Wang Sun, King Hyeonjong of Goryeo (고려 현종; 1 August 992 – 17 June 1031) — No issue.

=== Ancestry ===
Ancestors of Queen Wonmok

Sŏ Sin-il (서신일)
Sŏ P'il (서필)
Lady Hong, of the Hapcheon Hong clan (부인 합천홍씨)
Sŏ Hŭi (서희)
Lady, of the Pyongyang Hwang clan (부인 평양황씨)
Sŏ Nul (서눌)
Lady Han, of the Cheongju Han clan (부인 청주한씨)
Queen Wonmok (원목왕후)
Lady Ch'oe (최씨)
