= Royal Consort Gyeongmok Hyeon-Bi =

Goryeo queen (fl. 11th century)

Worthy Consort Gyeongmok 경목현비

Queen consort of Goryeo
- Tenure: 1031–1034
- Coronation: 1031
- Predecessor: Queen Wonseong
- Successor: Queen Gyeongseong
- Born: 1016; Goryeo
- Died: Unknown; Goryeo
- Spouse: Deokjong of Goryeo (m. 1031; died 1034)
- Issue: Princess Sanghoe
Posthumous name
- Gyeongmok (경목, 敬穆; "Respectful and Majestic")
- House: Cheongju Yi (by birth) House of Wang (by marriage)
- Father: Wang Ga-do
- Mother: Lady Gim, Princess Consort Gaeseong

Royal Consort Gyeongmok of the Gaeseong Wang clan (Korean: 경목현비 왕씨; Hanja: 敬穆賢妃 王氏; lit. 'Worthy Consort Gyeongmok of the Gaeseong Wang clan'; 1016–?) was a Goryeo queen consort as the first wife of King Deokjong and became the first Goryeo queen who didn't receive any posthumous name like Lady Yi.

== Biography ==
=== Early life and background ===
She was born as the second daughter and third child of Yi Ja-rim (이자림) and Princess Consort Gaeseong of the Gim clan (개성군부인 김씨) into the Cheongju Yi clan. She was the younger sister of Consort Wonjil, Hyeonjong of Goryeo's 9th wife.

Yi Ja-rim made achievements such as suppressing the rebellion and building Naseong in Gaegyeong, which was destroyed during Goryeo–Khitan War by the Liao Dynasty, later was given surname "Wang" (왕; 王) by King Hyeonjong with the name as "Ga-do" (가도). However, in 1033 (the 2nd year of King Deokjong), when Ga-do's tough policy against the Khitan was rejected by other officials, Wang then retired from politics, and her position was shaken.

=== Palace life ===
In 1030, they had a daughter. On 7 October 1031, she become Deokjong's queen consort and was honored as Consort Hyeon (현비; 賢妃). Although Wang was Deokjong's first wife and queen consort, in 1034 Deokjong lifted Hyeonjong of Goryeo's daughter, Queen Gyeongseong as his second wife and new queen consort. In that same year, Wang Ga-do died and Deokjong died not long after his death.

== Family ==
- Father - Wang Ga-do (왕가도; 王可道) or Yi Ja-rim (이자림) of the Cheongju Yi clan (980 – 1034)
- Mother - Princess Consort Gaeseong of the Kim clan (개성군부인 김씨; 開城郡夫人 金氏; 985–?)
- Sibling(s)
  - Older sister - Royal Consort Wonjil Gwi-bi of the Kim clan (원질귀비 김씨; 元質貴妃 金氏; 1011–?)
    - Brother-in-law - Wang Sun, Hyeongjong of Goryeo (현종 고려; 1 August 992 – 17 June 1031)
  - Older brother - Wang Mu-song (왕무숭; 王懋崇; 1013–?)
  - Younger sister - Lady Wang (왕씨; 1023–1077)
- Husband - Wang Heum, Deokjong of Goryeo (덕종 고려; 9 June 1016 – 31 October 1034)
  - Mother-in-law - Queen Wonseong of the Ansan Kim clan (원성왕후 김씨; 996 – 15 August 1028)
  - Father-in-law - Wang Sun, Hyeongjong of Goryeo (현종 고려; 1 August 992 – 17 June 1031)
- Issue
  - Daughter - Princess Sanghoe (상회공주; 1030–1033)
