= Gochang O clan =

Korean clan from North Jeolla Province

- Country: Korea
- Current region: Gochang County
- Founder: O Hak rin (Hanja: 吳學麟)

Gochang O clan (Korean: 고창 오씨; Hanja: 高敞 吳氏) was one of the Korean clans. Their Bon-gwan was in Gochang County, North Jeolla Province. According to the research in 2000, the number of Gochang O clan was 16716. Their founder was O Hak rin (Hanja: 吳學麟). He was a Hanlin Academy during Jeongjong, 10th monarch of Goryeo’s reign in Goryeo dynasty and a descendant of O Cheom (Hanja: 吳瞻) who came over from China to Silla during Jijeung of Silla’s reign in Silla dynasty.

== See also ==
- Korean clan names of foreign origin
