= Queen Hyosa =

Princess of Goryeo (fl. 11th century)

Queen Hyosa 효사왕후

Princess of Goryeo
- Predecessor: Princess Gyeongsuk
- Successor: Princess Hyogyeong
- Monarch: Wang Sun, King Hyeonjong
- Born: 1022; Goryeo
- Died: Unknown
- Spouse: Deokjong of Goryeo
Posthumous name
- Hyosa (효사, 孝思; "Filial and Thoughtful")
- House: Ansan Kim clan (official); Wang (agnatic)
- Father: Hyeonjong of Goryeo
- Mother: Queen Wonhye of the Ansan Kim clan
- Religion: Buddhism

Queen Hyosa of the Ansan Kim clan (Korean: 효사왕후 김씨; Hanja: 孝思王后 金氏; 1022–?) was a Goryeo princess as the daughter of King Hyeonjong and Queen Wonhye, also the full younger sister of King Munjong and King Jeonggan who became the third wife of her half brother, King Deokjong. Since they were once came from the same clan, Queen Hyosa became one of the Goryeo queens who followed their maternal clan.
