= Royal Consort Wonjil Gwi-Bi =

Goryeo consort (fl. 10th–11th centuries)

Noble Consort Wonjil 원질귀비
- Spouse: Hyeonjong of Goryeo
Posthumous name
- Wonjil (원질, 元質; "Primary and Upright")
- House: House of Wang (by marriage)
- Father: Wang Ga-do
- Mother: Lady Gim, Princess Consort Gaeseong

Royal Consort Wonjil of the Gaeseong Wang clan (Korean: 원질귀비 왕씨; Hanja: 元質貴妃 王氏; lit. 'Noble Consort Wonjil of the Gaeseong Wang clan') was a Korean royal consort as the 9th wife of King Hyeonjong of Goryeo.

She was born as the daughter Yi Ja-rim (이자림) and Princess Consort Gaeseong of the Gim clan (개성군부인 김씨) into the Cheongju Yi clan, also the sister of Consort Gyeongmok, Deokjong of Goryeo's 1st wife. Her father, Yi Ja-rim made achievements such as suppressing the rebellion and building Naseong in Gaegyeong, which was destroyed during Goryeo–Khitan War by the Liao Dynasty, later was given surname "Wang" (왕; 王) by King Hyeonjong with the name of "Ga-do" (가도). After her death, she then received her posthumous name of Noble Consort Wonjil (원질귀비; 元質貴妃).
