= Queen Gyeongseong =

Princess of Goryeo (fl. 11th century)

Queen Gyeongseong 경성왕후

Princess of Goryeo
- Reign: ?–1034
- Predecessor: Princess Hyogyeong
- Successor: Princess Aji
- Monarch: Wang Sun, King Hyeonjong

Queen consort of Goryeo
- Tenure: 1034–1034
- Coronation: 1034
- Predecessor: Royal Consort Gyeongmok
- Successor: Queen Yongsin
- Born: 1015; Goryeo
- Died: 23 September 1086 (aged 70-71); Goryeo
- Burial: around 1096; Jilleung tomb
- Spouse: Deokjong of Goryeo (m. 1034; died 1034)
Posthumous name
- Queen Yujeong Gwansuk Gyeongseong 유정관숙경성왕후 (柔貞寬肅敬成王后)
- House: Gyeongju Kim (official); Kaeseong Wang (agnatic and by marriage)
- Father: Hyeonjong of Goryeo
- Mother: Pure Consort Wonsun of the Gyeongju Kim clan
- Religion: Buddhism

Queen Gyeongseong of the Gyeongju Kim clan (Korean: 경성왕후 김씨; Hanja: 敬成王后 金氏; 1015 – 23 September 1086) was a Goryeo princess as the only daughter of King Hyeonjong and Consort Wonsun who became a queen consort through her marriage with her younger half-brother, King Deokjong as his second (formally as first and primary) wife. From this marriage, Queen Gyeongseong became the ninth reigned Goryeo queen who followed her maternal clan after Queen Wonhwa, her stepmother.

== Biography ==
Lady Wang was born in 1015 as the only daughter of Royal Consort Wonsun of the Gyeongju Kim clan and King Hyeongjong of Goryeo.

Through her maternal aunt (the princess' mother's younger sister), she was the older first cousins of Queen Inhye, Royal Consort Ingyeong and Royal Consort Injeol; who were the consorts of King Munjong of Goryeo, the future 11th King of Goryeo.

When still a child and royal princess, she was called Oldest Daughter of the Gyeongheung Residence (Korean: 경흥원 장녀; Hanja: 景興院 長女) since it was her mother's official residence. Since people of the same clan couldn't get married, she followed her maternal clan (Gyeongju Kim) and became the 19-year-old Deokjong's queen consort in 1034.

However, their marriage lasted only 7 months which Deokjong died in the same year, so she lived about 52 years alone. During her widowed life, she saw the reigns of four monarchs: Jeongjong, Munjong, Sunjong, Seonjong.

She was later buried in Jilleung (질릉; 質陵) alongside her late husband when she died in 1086, and received her posthumous name in 1096. Since the couple was childless, the queen couldn't or didn't receive the honorary name unlike the other queen dowagers.

== Posthumous name ==
- In April 1140 (18th year reign of King Injong), name Yu-jeong (유정; 柔貞) was added.
- In October 1253 (40th year reign of King Gojong), name Gwan-suk (관숙; 寬肅) was added to her posthumous name too.

== Family ==
- Father - Wang Sun, King Hyeonjong of Goryeo (고려 현종; 1 August 992 – 17 June 1031)
  - Grandfather - Wang Uk, Anjong of Goryeo (고려 안종; 920 – 24 July 996)
  - Grandmother - Queen Heonjeong of the Hwangju Hwangbo clan (헌정왕후 황보씨; 966–992)
- Mother - Royal Consort Wonsun of the Gyeongju Kim clan (원순숙비 김씨; 995–?)
  - Grandfather - Kim In-wi (김인위; 金因渭; 970–1031)
  - Grandmother - Lady Yi of the Yeonan Yi clan (연안 이씨; 延安 李氏; 970–?); daughter of Yi Hang-won (이항원; 940–?)
  - Cousin - Queen Inye of the Gyeongwon Yi clan (인예왕후 이씨; 1026 – 5 October 1092)
  - Cousin - Royal Consort Ingyeong of the Gyeongwon Yi clan (인경현비 이씨; 1027–?)
  - Cousin - Royal Consort Injeol of the Gyeongwon Yi clan (인절현비 이씨; 1030 – 25 August 1082)
- Spouse/Younger half-brother - Wang Hŭm, King Deokjong of Goryeo (고려 덕종; 9 June 1016 – 31 October 1034) — No issue.
