= Korea–Khitan War =

2023–2024 South Korean television series

- Promotional poster
- Hangul: 고려 거란 전쟁
- Hanja: 高麗契丹戰爭
- Lit.: Goryeo–Khitan War
- RR: Goryeo Georan jeonjaeng
- MR: Koryŏ Kŏran chŏnjaeng
- Genre: Sageuk; War drama; Action
- Based on: Goryeo–Khitan War: Sweet Rain in the Winter by Gil Seung-soo
- Written by: Gil Seung-soo; Lee Jung-woo
- Directed by: Jeon Woo-sung; Kim Han-sol
- Starring: Kim Dong-jun; Choi Soo-jong; Ji Seung-hyun
- Music by: Park Seung-jin
- Country of origin: South Korea
- Original language: Korean
- No. of episodes: 32

Production
- Executive producer: Kim Sang-hui
- Producers: Kim Hyeong-jun; Lee Eun-jin; Park Chun-ho; Park Je-hoon; Kim Chang-min
- Running time: 75 minutes
- Production companies: Monster Union; Vive Studios
- Budget: ₩27 billion

Original release
- Network: KBS2
- Release: November 11, 2023 – March 10, 2024

Korea–Khitan War (Korean: 고려 거란 전쟁; RR: Goryeo Georan jeonjaeng) is a 2023–2024 South Korean television series based on the 2018 South Korean novel Goryeo–Khitan War: Sweet Rain in the Winter by Gil Seung-soo. Produced to commemorate KBS’ 50th anniversary, the series stars Kim Dong-jun, Choi Soo-jong, and Ji Seung-hyun. It aired on KBS2 from November 11, 2023 to March 10, 2024, every Saturday and Sunday at 21:25 (KST). It is also available for streaming on Wavve in South Korea, on Kocowa in the Americas, and on Netflix in selected regions in Asia.

== Synopsis ==
The series tells the story of King Hyeonjong of Goryeo (Kim Dong-jun) uniting Goryeo under his tolerant leadership by leading the war against the Khitans to victory, together with Gang Gam-chan (Choi Soo-jong), the King's political mentor and the commander-in-chief of the Goryeo army.

== Cast ==
=== Main ===
- Kim Dong-jun as King Hyeonjong of Goryeo
- Choi Soo-jong as Gang Gam-chan
- Ji Seung-hyun as Yang Gyu

=== Supporting ===
==== People from Goryeo ====
- Lee Won-jong as Kang Cho
- Kim Jae-min as Lee Hyun-woon
- Han Jae-young as Ji Chae-mun
- Lee Ji-hoon as Jang Yeon-woo
- Jang In-sub as Hwangbo Yu-ui
- Ju Seok-tae as Choe Jil
- Ryu Seung-hyun as Kim Hoon
- Lee Cheol-min as Gang Min-cheom
- Kim San-ho as Jeong Seong
- Joo Yeon-woo as Kim Sook-heung
- Bang Jae-ho as Kim Jong-hyeon
- Jung Ho-bin as Yoo Bang
- Lee Jae-gu as Dae Do-su
- Kwak Min-seok as Won Jong-seok
- Lee Do-guk as Ha Gong-jin
- Jo Sang-gi as Tak Sa-jeong
- Kim Joong-don as Jo Won
- Kim Sun-bin as Choe Chung

==== People from Khitan Empire ====
- Kim Hyuk as Emperor Shengzong of Liao
- Kim Jun-bae as So Bae-ap (Xiao Paiya)
- Lee Sang-hong as Yayul Bun-no (Yelü Pennu)
- Park Jung-hwan as Yayul Jeok-ro (Yelü Dilu)
- Kim Gu-taek as Han-gi

==== Goryeo royal family and subjects ====
- Jo Hee-bong as Yoo Jin
- Kim Jeong-hak as Choe Hang
- Han Seung-hyun as Chae Chung-soon
- Park Yoo-seung as Choe Sa-wi
- Lee Si-a as Queen Wonjeong
- Ha Seung-ri as Queen Won-seong
- Yoon Chae-kyung as Queen Wonhwa
- Jo Seung-yeon as Kim Eun-bu
- Kim Oh-bok as Yang Hyeop
- Baek Sung-hyun as King Mokjong of Goryeo
- Lee Min-young as Empress Cheonchu
- Gong Jung-hwan as Kim Chi-yang
- Lee Poong-un as Yoo Haeng-gan
- Oh Jae-young as Yoo Chung-jeong

==== Others ====
- Shim So-young as Court Lady Choi
- Yoon Bok-in as Gang Gam-chan's wife
- Lee Jae-yong as Park Jin
- Kang Shin-il as Monk Jin-gwan

=== Extended ===
- Lee Chang-jik as Lee Joo-jeong

== Original soundtrack ==
=== Part 1 ===
Released on December 15, 2023
No.	Title	Lyrics	Music	Artist	Length
1.	"The Soaring" (비상)	Seodo	Seodo; Kim Seong-hyeon; Seodo Band	Seodo Band	4:39
2.	"The Soaring" (비상; Inst.)		Seodo; Kim Seong-hyeon; Seodo Band		4:39
Total length:					9:18

=== Part 2 ===
Released on December 29, 2023
No.	Title	Lyrics	Music	Artist	Length
1.	"The Last Storm" (폭풍)	Chae Ul	Lee Sang-jun; Cha Gil-wan	Kim Jang-hoon	4:20
2.	"The Last Storm" (폭풍; Inst.)		Lee Sang-jun; Cha Gil-wan		4:20
Total length:					8:40

=== Part 3 ===
Released on January 18, 2024
No.	Title	Lyrics	Music	Artist	Length
1.	"A Red Winter" (적동(붉은겨울))	Ahn Ye-eun	Park Seong-jin; Choi Min-chang	Ahn Ye-eun	4:29
2.	"A Red Winter" (적동(붉은겨울); Inst.)		Park Seong-jin; Choi Min-chang		4:29
Total length:					8:58

=== Part 4 ===
Released on February 2, 2024
No.	Title	Lyrics	Music	Artist	Length
1.	"The Man Who Can't Fall Down" (그 겨울에 나는)	Mavi	Mavi	Iyagi	4:45
2.	"The Man Who Can't Fall Down" (그 겨울에 나는; Inst.)		Mavi		4:45
Total length:					9:30

=== Album OST ===
Released on February 17, 2024
No.	Title	Lyrics	Music	Artist	Length
1.	"A Red Winter" (적동(붉은겨울))	Ahn Ye-eun	Park Seong-jin; Choi Min-chang	Ahn Ye-eun	4:29
2.	"The Last Storm" (폭풍)	Chae Ul	Lee Sang-jun; Cha Gil-wan	Kim Jang-hoon	4:20
3.	"The Soaring" (비상)	Seodo	Seodo; Kim Seong-hyeon; Seodo Band	Seodo Band	4:39
4.	"The Man Who Can't Fall Down" (그 겨울에 나는)	Mavi	Mavi	Iyagi	4:45
5.	"Korea Khitan War"		Park Seong-jin; Choi Min-chang		2:55
6.	"Cry For the Nation"		Park Seong-jin; Choi Min-chang		1:54
7.	"Into the Enemys"		Park Seong-jin; Choi Min-chang		2:49
8.	"Khitan Attack"		Park Seong-jin; Choi Min-chang		2:52
9.	"Destiny of the King"		Park Seong-jin; Choi Min-chang		2:28
10.	"Appearance of the Enemy"		Park Seong-jin; Choi Min-chang		3:15
Total length:					34:26

== Reception ==
=== Critical response ===
Puah Ziwei of NME rated the series 5 out of 5 stars, claiming that "this well-written Korean historical series will keep you hooked on its bloody tale of war and survival." He praised the conflict between Kang Cho and Gang Gam-chan, respectively played by Lee Won-jong and Choi Soo-jong, and the "delightfully malleable" performance of Baek Sung-hyun who played Mokjong, "an openly gay king" without any heirs. He also applauded the fact that the show depicted the times of Goryeo–Khitan War through an "old-school sageuk charm and style", and stated that "much like the anxious times it is inspired by, Korea-Khitan War is driven by purpose and complex interpersonal dynamics that leave little time for theatrics". Choi Bo-yun noted that in the series, there is a narrative of putting people first even in the midst of war, shedding light on less well-known battles and figures of Korean history such as Yang Gyu, and that the growth of King Hyeonjong who won the two wars against the Khitans with the help of Gang Gam-chan is worth watching.

Historical novel author Gil Seung-soo, who wrote the original novel which the series is based on, expressed his disappointment about the progression of the show after episode 16, since he was dissatisfied by the fact that it not only deviated from his novel, but also from actual Goryeo history. He criticized the attitude of the scriptwriter and the way he anachronistically portrayed the local gentries of early 11th century Goryeo, claiming that the series' depiction is just as absurd as "BTS suddenly appearing right after the Korean war" and that the production team should have been more careful to depict history accurately. The article noted that many viewers also complained about the storyline after episode 16, even visiting author Gil's personal blog to leave a comment about their concerns for the series.

=== Viewership ===
Korea–Khitan War : South Korea viewers per episode (millions)

Episodes	Episode number															
Episodes	1	2	3	4	5	6	7	8	9	10	11	12	13	14	15	16
1–16	0.941	1.249	1.023	1.343	1.373	1.382	1.498	1.454	1.590	1.789	1.701	N/A	N/A	N/A	1.849	1.939
17–32	1.716	1.857	1.377	1.819	1.703	1.764	1.656	1.815	1.596	2.015	1.907	2.204	1.890	2.307	2.032	2.444

Source: Audience measurement performed nationwide by Nielsen Korea.

Average TV viewership ratings
Ep.	Original broadcast date	Average audience share		
Ep.	Original broadcast date	Nielsen Korea		TNmS
Ep.	Original broadcast date	Nationwide	Seoul	Nationwide
1	November 11, 2023	5.5% (5th)	5.1% (6th)	N/A
2	November 12, 2023	6.8% (4th)	6.1% (4th)	5.7% (6th)
3	November 18, 2023	5.2% (6th)	5.1% (5th)	N/A
4	November 19, 2023	7.0% (5th)	6.4% (5th)	5.5% (7th)
5	November 25, 2023	7.5% (3rd)	7.0% (3rd)	6.1% (5th)
6	November 26, 2023	7.8% (4th)	6.9% (4th)	6.2% (5th)
7	December 2, 2023	8.4% (2nd)	7.8% (2nd)	6.5% (4th)
8	December 3, 2023	7.9% (4th)	7.1% (4th)	6.0% (6th)
9	December 9, 2023	8.9% (3rd)	8.6% (3rd)	N/A
10	December 10, 2023	10.0% (3rd)	9.2% (3rd)	7.9% (4th)
11	December 16, 2023	9.7% (2nd)	9.2% (2nd)	N/A
12	December 17, 2023	9.6% (4th)	N/A	8.5% (4th)
13	December 24, 2023	9.2% (3rd)	N/A	N/A
14	December 30, 2023	9.4% (2nd)	N/A	N/A
15	January 6, 2024	10.2% (2nd)	9.2% (3rd)	N/A
16	January 7, 2024	10.0% (3rd)	8.7% (4th)	N/A
17	January 13, 2024	9.8% (2nd)	9.0% (2nd)	N/A
18	January 14, 2024	10.0% (3rd)	8.7% (4th)	N/A
19	January 20, 2024	7.9% (2nd)	6.4% (3rd)	N/A
20	January 21, 2024	10.1% (3rd)	9.1% (3rd)	N/A
21	January 27, 2024	9.6% (3rd)	8.6% (3rd)	N/A
22	January 28, 2024	9.6% (3rd)	8.5% (3rd)	N/A
23	February 3, 2024	9.7% (3rd)	8.8% (3rd)	N/A
24	February 4, 2024	10.0% (3rd)	8.6% (3rd)	N/A
25	February 17, 2024	8.7% (3rd)	7.6% (3rd)	N/A
26	February 18, 2024	11.5% (3rd)	10.2% (3rd)	N/A
27	February 24, 2024	11.0% (2nd)	9.7% (3rd)	N/A
28	February 25, 2024	12.7% (3rd)	10.9% (3rd)	N/A
29	March 2, 2024	11.0% (2nd)	9.3% (3rd)	N/A
30	March 3, 2024	12.9% (3rd)	10.9% (3rd)	N/A
31	March 9, 2024	12.0% (2nd)	10.7% (3rd)	N/A
32	March 10, 2024	13.8% (2nd)	12.1% (3rd)	N/A
Average		9.65%	— (Note: Due to some unpublished ratings, the exact average rating is unknown.)	—
In the table above, the blue numbers represent the lowest ratings and the red numbers represent the highest ratings.; N/A denotes ratings that were not published.

=== Accolades ===
Name of the award ceremony, year presented, category, nominee of the award, and the result of the nomination
Award ceremony	Year	Category	Nominee / Work	Result	Ref.
Baeksang Arts Awards	2024	Best Supporting Actor	Ji Seung-hyun	Nominated	
Baeksang Arts Awards	2024	Technical Award	Lee Seok-geun (Costume design)	Nominated	
KBS Drama Awards	2023	Best Couple Award	Choi Soo-jong and Kim Dong-jun	Won	
KBS Drama Awards	2023	Best Supporting Actor	Lee Won-jong	Won	
KBS Drama Awards	2023	Excellence Award, Actor in a Serial Drama	Ji Seung-hyun	Won	
KBS Drama Awards	2023	Grand Prize (Daesang)	Choi Soo-jong	Won	
KBS Drama Awards	2023	Popularity Award, Actor	Ji Seung-hyun	Won	
KBS Drama Awards	2023	Scriptwriter Award	Lee Jung-woo	Won	
KBS Drama Awards	2023	Top Excellence Award, Actor	Kim Dong-jun	Won	
KBS Drama Awards	2023	Best New Actress	Lee Si-a	Nominated	
KBS Drama Awards	2023	Best Supporting Actor	Kim Hyuk	Nominated	
KBS Drama Awards	2023	Best Young Actor	Hong Jae-min	Nominated	
KBS Drama Awards	2023	Excellence Award, Actor in a Serial Drama	Choi Soo-jong	Nominated	
KBS Drama Awards	2023	Excellence Award, Actor in a Serial Drama	Kim Dong-jun	Nominated	
KBS Drama Awards	2023	Excellence Award, Actor in a Serial Drama	Kim Jun-bae	Nominated	
KBS Drama Awards	2023	Excellence Award, Actress in a Serial Drama	Lee Si-a	Nominated	
KBS Drama Awards	2023	Top Excellence Award, Actor	Choi Soo-jong	Nominated	
Korea Drama Awards	2024	Excellence in Acting Award (Male)	Ji Seung-hyun	Won	
Seoul International Drama Awards	2024	Best Series Drama	Korea–Khitan War	Won	
