= Chŏng Sŏng =

Goryeo military commander (fl. 11th century)

- Hangul: 정성
- Hanja: 鄭成
- RR: Jeong Seong
- MR: Chŏng Sŏng

Chŏng Sŏng (Korean: 정성; Hanja: 鄭成; fl. 11th century) was a Goryeo military commander during the Second Goryeo-Khitan War.

== Biography ==
In 1010, Chŏng Sŏng was the garrison commander (진사; 鎭使; chinsa) of Hŭnghwajin (흥화진; 興化鎭) and the director of the Ministry of Revenue (호부낭중; 戶部郎中; hobu nangjung), when the Khitan Emperor Shengzong invaded Goryeo with his army of 400,000 men and laid siege to the fortress of Hŭnghwajin. Alongside Sŏbungmyŏn military inspector Yang Kyu and Yi Suhwa (이수화; 李守和), Chŏng defended the fort from the Khitan besiegers. Failing to take Hŭnghwajin, the Khitan army lifted the siege and continued going south.

On March 6, 1011, Chŏng Sŏng attacked the retreating Khitans from the rear when they were halfway through the Yalu River, with many of the retreating soldiers drowning in the river.

== In popular culture ==
- Portrayed by Kim San-ho in the 2023 KBS1 TV series Korea–Khitan War.
