= Princess Doae =

- Princess of Goryeo
- Died: 1057; Goryeo
- House: House of Wang (by birth)
- Father: Jeongjong of Goryeo
- Mother: Queen Yongmok of the Buyeo Yi clan
- Religion: Buddhism

Korean name
- Hangul: 도애공주
- Hanja: 悼哀公主
- RR: Doae gongju
- MR: Toae kongju

Princess Doae (died 1057) was a Goryeo Royal Princess as the only daughter of King Jeongjong and Queen Yongmok, also the niece of King Deokjong and maternal niece of his 4th wife. Since there are no detailed records left, so not much is known about her life.
