= Yang Kyu =

Goryeo commander (fl. 11th century)

- Hangul: 양규
- Hanja: 楊規
- RR: Yang Gyu
- MR: Yang Kyu

Yang Kyu (Korean: 양규; Hanja: 楊規; ? – March 5, 1011) was a Korean military official who served the Goryeo dynasty. He fought in the second conflict in the Goryeo–Khitan War.

== Biography ==
During the reign of King Mokjong, Yang Kyu served as the director of the Ministry of Justice (형부낭중; 刑部郎中; hyŏngbu nangjung). In 1010, during the Liao invasion, Yang was appointed as military inspector (도순검사; 都巡檢使; tosun'gŏmsa) of Sŏbungmyŏn. He defeated the Liao army at Hŭnghwa-jin, resisting calls to surrender, and prevented the fortress' fall. The Liao army lifted the siege and left Hŭnghwa-jin. The Liao defeated Kang Cho's 300, 000 man army at T'ongju (modern day Sonchon County).

The Khitans sent No Chŏn (노전; 盧戩), a captured Goryeo official, with forged edict purporting to be from Kang Cho asking Yang to surrender the fortress. Yang refused as he would only take orders from the king, not Kang. After this, Yang left Hŭnghwa-jin with 700 men and regrouped with 1000 man strong remnant of Kang Cho's army at T'ongju. With the combined 1,700 man army, Yang recaptured Kwakchu (곽주; 郭州), modern-day Chongju, from a Liao force of 6,000. The liberated civilian population of 7,000 was relocated to T'ongju.

By 1011, the Liao army had managed to capture the Goryeo capital of Kaegyong, however the Goryeo king, Hyeonjong, had already escaped south to Naju. The Liao then planned to withdraw and retreat from Goryeo, taking the Goryeo captives with them. Yang attacked the Liao forces to free the Goryeo captives. At Murodae (무로대; 無老代), Yang defeated 2000 Khitans and liberated 2,000 captives. He then went to Sŏngnyŏng (석령; 石嶺), and defeated 2500 Khitans and freed 1000 prisoners. At Yŏrich'am (여리참; 余里站), Yang's forces killed 1000 Khitans and freed another 1000 prisoners. Yang then met up with the commander of Kwiju, Kim Sukhŭng (김숙흥; 金叔興), and together their forces attacked the Liao vanguard at Aejŏn (애전; 艾田) on March 5 (January 28 in the lunar calendar). However, they ran out of arrows, and were defeated and killed in battle. In total, Yang's troops fought 7 times in one month, killing 15,000 enemy combatants and freeing up to 30,000 captives. They also captured various loot from the Liao armies, such as weapons, horses and camels.

== In popular culture ==
- Portrayed by Hong Il-kwon in the 2009 KBS2 TV series Empress Cheonchu.
- Portrayed by Ji Seung-hyun in the 2023 KBS1 TV series Korea–Khitan War.
