= Prince Aesang =

- Prince of Goryeo
- Born: Wang Bang; Kingdom of Goryeo
- House: Wang
- Father: Jeongjong of Goryeo
- Mother: Queen Yongui of the Danju Han clan
- Religion: Buddhism

Korean name
- Hangul: 왕방
- Hanja: 王昉
- RR: Wang Bang
- MR: Wang Pang

Royal title
- Hangul: 애상군
- Hanja: 哀殤君
- RR: Aesanggun
- MR: Aesanggun

Prince Aesang (Korean: 애상군; Hanja: 哀殤君), personal name Wang Pang (Korean: 왕방; Hanja: 王昉) was a Korean Royal Prince as the first and oldest son of Jeongjong of Goryeo and Queen Yongui. As there was no detailed records left about his life, so it seems it all were removed and deleted during King Munjong's reign.
