= Deokbi Jo =

Goryeo consort (fl. 14th century)

Royal Consort Deok-Bi Jo 덕비 조씨

Royal consort of Goryeo
- Tenure: c.1385–1388
- Coronation: c.1385
- Predecessor: Royal Consort Jeong
- Successor: Royal Consort Seon
- Born: Bonggayi; Goryeo
- Spouse: U of Goryeo
- House: Jo clan (by birth); House of Wang (by marriage)
- Father: Jo Yeong-gil (조영길)
- Mother: servant of Yi In-im
- Religion: Buddhism

Royal Consort Deok of the Jo clan (Korean: 덕비 조씨; Hanja: 德妃 趙氏), personal name Bonggayi (봉가이; 鳳加伊) was a Korean Royal Consort as the 7th wife of King U of Goryeo. She was also known as Princess Suknyeong or Consort Heon.

She firstly met King U at Yi In-im (이인임)'s house in 1384 and, gaining his favour, soon became his consort. Following this, her father was given a horse while the king and Bonggayi went to the suburbs every day together. Due to old laws called "Cheonjasumobeop" (천자수모법), which decreed that if parents were enslaved, then children would have the same status, Bonggayi was regarded as Yi's slave. However, her family status was changed after she became a royal consort.

In the same year, Consort Suk became jealous that Bonggayi was the king's favourite concubine at this time. Then, in 1385, Bonggayi was made Princess Suknyeong (숙녕옹주; 肅寧翁主) and promoted to Consort Heon (헌비; 憲妃) a year later while living in Suknyeong Mansion (숙녕부; 肅寧府) which was specially made for her. The king became very angry after discovering that there weren't any gem decorations to give to her. She formally became Consort Deok (덕비; 德妃) in 1387 after accused Consort Suk for wearing such impolite accessories and advised the king to not kill innocent people recklessly.

In 1388, alongside the king and his other consorts, they were all exiled to Saga while Bonggayi's father was exiled and died after he caught of sneaking into Gaegyeong.
