= Kim San-ho =

South Korean actor (born 1982)

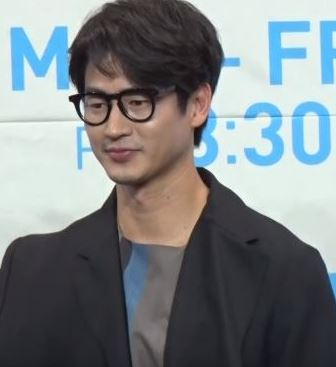
- Kim San-ho in April 2019
- Born: February 12, 1982 (age 44); Cheonan, South Chungcheong Province, South Korea
- Education: Seoul Institute of the Arts - Theater; Korea Arts Institute - Musical Acting
- Occupation: Actor
- Years active: 2003–present
- Agent: The People Entertainment

Korean name
- Hangul: 김산호
- RR: Gim Sanho
- MR: Kim Sanho

Kim San-ho (born February 12, 1982) is a South Korean actor. Kim is best known in musical theatre, having starred in Korean stage productions of Grease, The Fantasticks and the Kim Kwang-seok jukebox musical The Days. On television, he has also appeared in the drama Love, My Love and several seasons of the sitcom Rude Miss Young-ae.

== Musical theatre ==
Year	Title	Role	Notes/Ref.
2006	The Kingdom of the Winds	Muhyul/Goeyu	2007, 2009
2006–2007	Grease	Danny Zuko	2008, 2009, 2010, 2011
2009	Shin Sang-nam Musical Concert	Sexy Guy	
2009	Thrill Me	Richard Loeb	
2009	Fever Night - Season 2		
2009–2010	The Fantasticks	Matt	2010–2011
2010–2011	Music in My Heart	Jang Jae-hyuk	
2011	March of Youth	Wang Gyeong-tae	
2011	Temptation of Wolves	Ban Hae-won	
2012	Caffeine	Kang Ji-min	
2012–2013	Legally Blonde	Warner Huntington III	
2013	The Days	Dae-sik	2014, 2015, 2016, 2017, 2018, 2019, 2023
2022	Mrs. Doubt Fire	Stewart	
2022–2023	The Devotion of Suspect X	Kusanagi	

== Filmography ==
=== Film ===
Year	Title	Role
2008	Crazy Waiting	Jeong Eung-seok
2010	A Friend in Need (Yeouido)	Park Min-hyuk
2011	My Secret Partner	Min-soo

=== Television series ===
Year	Title	Role	Notes/Ref.
2006	Mr. Goodbye	Kim Dong-rae	
2006	Look Back with a Smile	Kim San-ho	
2007	Kimchi Cheese Smile	Kim San-ho	
2008	My Precious You	Kang Min	
2009–2015	Ugly Miss Young-ae	Kim San-ho	Season 6–11, 14
2012	Love, My Love	Kang Tae-bum	
2013	Monstar	Choi Joon-goo	
2013	Let's Eat	Kim Hak-moon's restaurant owner	Cameo (episode 13)
2014	Mental Shooter	San-ho	
2014	The Idle Mermaid	Sun-jae	
2016	Moon Lovers: Scarlet Heart Ryeo	Crown Prince Wang Mu	
2018	Goodbye to Goodbye	Moon Jong-won	
2019	Home for Summer	Han Seok-ho	
2022	Blind	Park Moo-hyeok	Cameo (episode 16)
2023–2024	Korea–Khitan War	Lieutenant Jung Seong	

=== Web series ===
Year	Title	Role	Ref.
2017	Sweet Revenge	Music teacher	

=== Variety shows ===
Year	Title	Role	Ref.
2020	King of Mask Singer	Contestant as "White Flag" (episode 271)	
2021	Liberation Town	Cast Member	
2022	Korea's Dullegil	Participant	

=== Music video appearances ===
Year	Song title	Artist
2009	"Goblet of Tears"	Park Sang-min
