= Marquess of Gaeseong =

Korean prince

Marquess Gaeseong
- Prince of Goryeo
- Born: Wang Kae; Goryeo
- Died: 1062; Goryeo
- House: Wang
- Father: Jeongjong of Goryeo
- Mother: Queen Yongui of the Danju Han clan
- Religion: Buddhism

Korean name
- Hangul: 왕개
- Hanja: 王暟
- RR: Wang Gae
- MR: Wang Kae

Royal title
- Hangul: 개성후
- Hanja: 開城侯
- RR: Gaeseonghu
- MR: Kaesŏnghu

Posthumous name
- Hangul: 신상
- Hanja: 愼殤
- RR: Sinsang
- MR: Sinsang

Marquess Gaeseong (Korean: 개성후; Hanja: 開城侯; d. 1062), personal name Wang Kae (Korean: 왕개; Hanja: 王暟) was a Korean Royal Prince as the third and youngest son of Jeongjong of Goryeo and Queen Yongui. Due to his father's death when he was young, so he was raised and brought up into the Palace by his half-uncle, Munjong of Goryeo.

In 1052, he became the preceptor in Dongsam Temple, Gaebu and appointed as Sangseoryeong (상서령) to work in Sangju State with his new title as Marquess Gaeseong (개성후; 開城侯). At the same time, he also received 2.000 sik-eup (식읍). Then became Jainborijwahwagongsin (자인보리좌화공신; 資仁保理佐化功臣). He later died in 1062 and received his posthumous name Sinsang (신상; 愼殤).
