= Queen Munhwa =

Grand consort of Goryeo (fl. 11th century)

Queen Munhwa 문화왕후

Grand consort of Goryeo
- Tenure: 1029–?
- Coronation: 1029
- Predecessor: Position established
- Successor: Grand Consort Hong
- Monarch: Wang Sun, King Hyeonjong
- Born: 960; Seonju, Goryeo
- Died: fl.1029 Goryeo
- Spouse: Seongjong of Goryeo (m. 994)
- Issue: Queen Wonjeong
Regnal name
- Princess Yeonheung (연흥궁주; 延興宮主); Princess Hyeondeok (현덕궁주; 玄德宮主); Grand Consort Kim (Dae-bi; 대비 김씨, 大妃 金氏)
Posthumous name
- Munhwa (문화, 文和; "Civil and Harmonious")
- House: Seonsan Kim clan (official); Wang (by marriage)
- Father: Kim Won-sung
- Mother: Grand Lady Wang of Hwaui County
- Religion: Buddhism

Queen Munhwa of the Seonsan Kim clan (Korean: 문화왕후 김씨; Hanja: 文和王后 金氏; 960–?) was the second wife of Seongjong of Goryeo and the mother of Queen Wonjeong. She was Goryeo's first Grand Consort (대비; 大妃) even though King Taejo's daughter, Queen Dowager Sunan, was already Queen Dowager.

== Biography ==
She was born in 960 in Seonju (now Seonsan-eup, Gumi, North Gyeongsang Province) as the daughter of Kim Won-sung and Lady Wang.

After her marriage with King Seongjong, she was formally called as Princess Yeonheung (연흥궁주; 延興宮主) while living in "Yeonheung Palace" (연흥궁; 延興宮) and Princess Hyeondeok (현덕궁주; 玄德宮主) since she lived in "Hyeondeok Palace" (현덕궁; 玄德宮).

She was said to have raised and taken care of her husband's two nephews (Wang Song and Wang Sun) as their parents died young.

During King Hyeonjong's reign, she was denied the title of queen dowager and instead became Grand Consort in 1029 with the equivalent authority of a queen dowager. Various government positions, lands and honours were granted to her relatives.

As her death date was unknown and became grand consort in 1029, it was presumed that she might have died after that. Her funeral procedure became a predicament for Queen Wonmok and Consort Wonsun since King Munjong discussed what to do with Wonmok's rite as he prepared a plan based on the example of the Seonsan Kim clan.

Her official residence, Hyeondeok Palace was then inherited by her only daughter with Seongjong, Queen Wonjeong, and was used as one of the Goryeo royal palaces by King Chungsuk later when he reigned.

== Family ==
- Father - Kim Won-sung (특진 수태위 겸 시중 화의군개국후 김원숭; 特進 守太尉 兼 侍中 和義郡開國侯 金元崇; 935–?)
  - Grandfather - Kim Gwang-ui (상서좌복야 상주국 회의국개국백 김광의; 金光義; 915–?)
  - Grandmother - Grand Princess Hwaui of the Kim clan (화의군대부인 김씨; 和義君大夫人 金氏; 915–?)
- Mother - Grand Princess Hwaui of the Kaeseong Wang clan (화의군대부인 왕씨; 和義君大夫人 王氏; 935–?)
- Spouse
  - Wang Ch'i, Seongjong of Goryeo (고려 성종; 15 January 961 – 8 November 997)
    - Mother-in-law - Queen Seonui of the Chŏngju Yu clan (선의왕후 유씨; 937–?)
    - Fathet-in-law - Daejong of Goryeo (고려 대종; 937–969)
- Issue
  - Daughter - Queen Wonjeong of the Kim clan (원정왕후 김씨; 994–1018)
    - Son-in-law - Wang Sun, Hyeonjong of Goryeo (고려 현종; 992–1032)

== In popular culture ==
- Portrayed by Moon Jeong-hee and Kim Min-ji in the 2009 KBS2 TV series Empress Cheonchu.
