= Search: WWW =

2019 South Korean television series

- Promotional poster
- Hangul: 검색어를 입력하세요 WWW
- Lit.: Type in Search Word: WWW
- RR: Geomsaegeoreul imnyeokhaseyo WWW
- MR: Kŏmsaegŏrŭl imnyŏkhaseyo WWW
- Genre: Romance; Melodrama
- Created by: Studio Dragon
- Written by: Kwon Do-eun
- Directed by: Jung Ji-hyun; Kwon Young-il
- Starring: Im Soo-jung; Lee Da-hee; Jeon Hye-jin; Jang Ki-yong; Lee Jae-wook; Ji Seung-hyun
- Country of origin: South Korea
- Original language: Korean
- No. of episodes: 16

Production
- Producer: Yoon Ha-rim
- Running time: 70 minutes
- Production company: Hwa&Dam Pictures

Original release
- Network: tvN
- Release: June 5 – July 25, 2019

Search: WWW (Korean: 검색어를 입력하세요 WWW) is a 2019 South Korean television series starring Im Soo-jung, Lee Da-hee, Jeon Hye-jin, Jang Ki-yong, Lee Jae-wook, and Ji Seung-hyun. It aired on tvN from June 5 to July 25, 2019.

== Synopsis ==
The story of three women in their late thirties — Bae Ta-mi, Cha Hyeon and Song Ga-kyeong — who work in the top two competitive web portal companies: Unicon and Barro.

== Cast ==
=== Main ===
- Im Soo-jung as Bae Ta-mi (Tammy, 38 years old)

She is a director of search department of Unicon, the top web portal company. She is smart, talented, intellectual, goal-oriented, determined and a person of high morals. Later, she joins Barro after being fired by Unicon. She is a workaholic and has no time for dating, nor does she intend to get married. She falls for Park Mo-gun after running across him several times.

- Lee Da-hee as Cha Hyeon (Scarlett, 37 years old)

She is the social director of Barro (Unicon's rival company). She seems tough from outside, but has a very warm and kind heart. She is a former Jujitsu player and is very good at Jujitsu. Her only goal is to become super rich so that she can pay for medical expenses after beating anyone she feels like. She falls for Seol Ji-hwan.

- Jeon Hye-jin as Song Ga-kyeong (39 years old)

The director of Unicon. She was once in good terms with Ta Mi. She is also a senior in school to Cha Hyeon. Initially she was from a conglomerate family. Her family used to own a battery business. She married Oh Jin-woo for business reasons and it is solely a contractual marriage. But her family went bankrupt, leading her to become a puppet of her mother-in-law. She dated Han Min-gyu for a while.

- Jang Ki-yong as Park Mo-gun/ Park Morgan (28 years old)

He is the CEO of Millim Sound company. He is born to Korean parents but was abandoned in his childhood and was later adopted by an Australian couple. Mo-gun meets Bae Ta Mi at an arcade and they have a one-night stand. He has a collaboration with Unicon's video games department. Mo-gun meets Ta-mi again at Unicon and eventually falls for her.

- Lee Jae-wook as Seol Ji-hwan (30 years old)

An aspiring actor who is quite neglected and remains unacknowledged by the film industry. He becomes acquainted with Cha Hyeon after an unfortunate accident. He plays the roles of villains in dramas but, in real life, he is kind, introverted and warm-hearted. He falls for Cha Hyeon.

- Ji Seung-hyun as Oh Jin-woo (40 years old)

Youngest son of KU group's chairwoman Jang He eun. He is despised by his mother a lot. He is a movie director and producer by profession. Jin-woo is also the husband of Unicon's director Song Ga-kyeong. He has affairs with numerous women behind his wife's back. But deep inside, he truly cares for Ga-kyeong, though his marriage with Ga-kyeong appears to be contractual solely for business purposes.

=== Supporting ===
==== People at Barro ====
- Kwon Hae-hyo as Min Hong-joo (Brian)

He is the CEO of Barro. He is always protective of the company's employees.

- Kim Nam-hee as Pyo Joon-soo (Matthew)

The Director of Gaming Department in Barro - A total womaniser. He dated Bae Ta Mi when they were in their early twenties. He is dating Cha Hyeon and Yoon Dong Joo simultaneously.

- Woo Ji-hyun as Choi Bong-gi (Joseph)

He used to work at Unicon but, he left and followed Bae Ta Mi to Barro. He works for Barro Service Care team.

- Oh Ah-yeon as Jo Ah-ra (Ellie)

She is a capable and talented woman. She used to work at Unicon's cafe. She followed Bae Ta Mi as well. She works for Service care team as well.

- Ha Seung-ri as Hong Yoo-jin (Jenny)

She is the senior manager of Development Team. She is more fluent in programming than in any language. She is also a member of Service Care team led by Bae Ta Mi.

- Song Ji-ho as Choi Jeong-hoon (Alex)

He is the senior manager of Marketing Team of Barro. Cha Hyeon's assistant and member of Service Care team.

==== Others ====
- Yoo Seo-jin as Na In-kyeong.

CEO of Unicon. She is a corrupted and power seeking woman.

- Tak Woo-suk as Kim Seon-woo.

He is an employee of Park Mo-gun. He works at Millim Sound.

- Han Ji-wan as Jeong Da-in.

A pianist and a friend of Ta Mi. She returned to Korea after living in Germany for 10 years. Later, it turns out that Park Morgan was her first love . They meet again at a school reunion. And later, decided to have a business collaboration between them.

- Lee Ji-ha as Park Morgan's biological mother.

She abandoned Park Morgan at a very young age and remarries to have a family.

- Jo Hye-joo as Yoon Dong-joo.

An online blogger. She is the young girlfriend of Matthew's (Pyo Joon Soo). She is in her twenties.

- Ye Soo-jung as Jang Hee-eun.

Song Ga kyung's mother in law and Oh Jin Woo's mother. She is the chairwoman of KU Group. She is quite corrupt and works as a slave to the President.

- Byeon Woo-seok as Han Min-gyu.

He is a model and an actor who is sponsored by Director Song Ga-Kyung. He dated director Song Ga-kyung for a while.

=== Special appearances ===
- Son Jong-hak as Seo Myeong-ho (Ep. 1)

Presidential Candidate.

- Choi Jin-ho as Joo Seung-tae (Ep. 1–2)

A corrupt politician; Assemblyman.

- Yoon Ji-on as Team manager
- Lee Tae-ri as webtoon artist Godori (Ep. 7)
- Lee Dong-wook as Ta-mi's ex-boyfriend (Ep. 7)

He worked at Barro for 6 months and is getting married.

- Seo Woo-jin as a kidnapped child

The child who was being kidnapped.

== Production ==
The first script reading was held on February 22, 2019, with the attendance of the cast and crew.

The series is the debut of Kwon Do-eun as head writer after working as an associate to Kim Eun-sook.

== Original soundtrack ==
=== Part 1 ===
Released on June 7, 2019
| No. | Title | Lyrics | Music | Artist | Length |
|---|---|---|---|---|---|
| 1. | "Milky Way Between Us" (우리 사이 은하수를 만들어) | Kako | Curtis F; Kako | O3ohn | 3:24 |
| 2. | "Milky Way Between Us" (Inst.) | | Curtis F; Kako | | 3:24 |
| Total length: | | | | | 6:48 |

=== Part 2 ===
Released on June 13, 2019
| No. | Title | Lyrics | Music | Artist | Length |
|---|---|---|---|---|---|
| 1. | "Search" | Elaine; Ji Ye-joon; Jayins | Lim Ha-young; Ji Ye-joon; Jayins | Elaine | 2:23 |
| 2. | "Search" (Inst.) | | Lim Ha-young; Ji Ye-joon; Jayins | | 2:12 |
| Total length: | | | | | 4:35 |

=== Part 3 ===
Released on June 20, 2019
| No. | Title | Lyrics | Music | Artist | Length |
|---|---|---|---|---|---|
| 1. | "Reaching Hand" (손 닿으면) | Ha Melli | Park Geun-chul; Jung Soo-min | Jang Beom-jun | 4:07 |
| 2. | "Reaching Hand" (Inst.) | | Park Geun-chul; Jung Soo-min | | 4:07 |
| Total length: | | | | | 8:14 |

=== Part 4 ===
Released on June 28, 2019
| No. | Title | Lyrics | Music | Artist | Length |
|---|---|---|---|---|---|
| 1. | "Scent" (향기) | 88KEYS | 88KEYS | Sam Kim | 4:00 |
| 2. | "Scent" (Inst.) | | 88KEYS | | 4:00 |
| Total length: | | | | | 8:00 |

=== Part 5 ===
Released on July 4, 2019
| No. | Title | Lyrics | Music | Artist | Length |
|---|---|---|---|---|---|
| 1. | "WOW" | Moonbyul (Mamamoo); Kim Min | Taylor; Kim Min | Mamamoo | 3:20 |
| 2. | "WOW" (Inst.) | | Taylor; Kim Min | | 3:20 |
| Total length: | | | | | 6:40 |

=== Part 6 ===
Released on July 11, 2019
| No. | Title | Lyrics | Music | Artist | Length |
|---|---|---|---|---|---|
| 1. | "You In The TV" (Tv에서 보는 그대 모습은) | Kim Hyun-chul | Kim Hyun-chul | Lee Da-hee | 4:05 |
| 2. | "You In The TV" (Inst.) | | Kim Hyun-chul | | 4:05 |
| Total length: | | | | | 8:10 |

=== Part 7 ===
Released on July 18, 2019
| No. | Title | Lyrics | Music | Artist | Length |
|---|---|---|---|---|---|
| 1. | "I Get A Little Bit Lonely" (조금 더 외로워지겠지) | Lee Mi-na | 1601 | Kim Na-young | 3:36 |
| 2. | "I Get A Little Bit Lonely" (Inst.) | | 1601 | | 3:36 |
| Total length: | | | | | 7:12 |

== Viewership ==
Search: WWW : South Korea viewers per episode (thousands)

| Season | Episode number | | | | | | | | | | | | | | | | Average |
| Season | 1 | 2 | 3 | 4 | 5 | 6 | 7 | 8 | 9 | 10 | 11 | 12 | 13 | 14 | 15 | 16 | Average |
|---|---|---|---|---|---|---|---|---|---|---|---|---|---|---|---|---|---|
| 1 | 585 | 756 | 823 | 742 | 808 | 837 | 769 | 813 | 815 | 708 | 920 | 806 | 968 | 874 | 969 | 1087 | 830 |

Source: Audience measurement performed nationwide by Nielsen Media Research.

Average TV viewership ratings
| Ep. | Original broadcast date | Title | Average audience share (AGB Nielsen) | |
| Ep. | Original broadcast date | Title | Nationwide | Seoul |
|---|---|---|---|---|
| 1 | June 5, 2019 | This Is the Internet | 2.431% | 3.004% |
| 2 | June 6, 2019 | My Greed Has No Motivation | 3.190% | 4.006% |
| 3 | June 12, 2019 | When Your Passion Is Fueled by Love | 3.221% | 3.741% |
| 4 | June 13, 2019 | Top Actor Han Min Kyu | 3.250% | 4.157% |
| 5 | June 19, 2019 | Keyword: Bae Ta Mi | 3.109% | 3.638% |
| 6 | June 20, 2019 | The Lex Series Laptop | 3.578% | 4.416% |
| 7 | June 26, 2019 | Leverage | 3.363% | 3.663% |
| 8 | June 27, 2019 | Marriage | 3.320% | 3.832% |
| 9 | July 3, 2019 | Striking Back | 3.652% | 3.860% |
| 10 | July 4, 2019 | Happy Birthday? | 3.165% | 3.301% |
| 11 | July 10, 2019 | Mixed Emotions for Ta Mi | 4.003% | 4.442% |
| 12 | July 11, 2019 | My Homepage | 3.488% | 4.210% |
| 13 | July 17, 2019 | A Common Cause | 3.906% | 4.727% |
| 14 | July 18, 2019 | Main Page Reformation | 3.567% | 4.247% |
| 15 | July 24, 2019 | The Long-Awaited Victory | 4.089% | 4.714% |
| 16 | July 25, 2019 | Defending Justice | 4.199% | 4.825% |
| Average | | | 3.471% | 4.049% |
In the table above, the blue numbers represent the lowest ratings and the red numbers represent the highest ratings.; This drama aired on a cable channel/pay TV which normally has a relatively smaller audience compared to free-to-air TV/public broadcasters (KBS, SBS, MBC and EBS).

== Awards and nominations ==
| Year | Award | Category | Recipient | Result | Ref. |
|---|---|---|---|---|---|
| 2019 | 12th Korea Drama Awards | Top Excellence Award, Actress | Im Soo-jung | Nominated | |
| 2019 | 12th Korea Drama Awards | Best Original Soundtrack | "WOW" (Mamamoo) | Nominated | |
