= Ji Seung-hyun (actor) =

South Korean actor (born 1981)

Ji Seung-Hyun
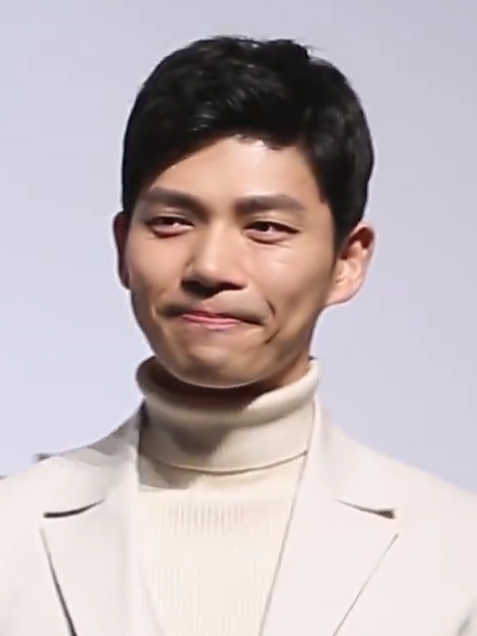
- Ji in 2017
- Born: December 19, 1981 (age 44); Daegu, South Korea
- Education: Kyung Hee University – English Language and Literature
- Occupation: Actor
- Years active: 2009–present
- Agent: Big Whale Entertainment

Korean name
- Hangul: 지승현
- Hanja: 池承炫
- RR: Ji Seunghyeon
- MR: Chi Sŭnghyŏn

Ji Seung-Hyun (Korean: 지승현; born December 19, 1981) is a South Korean actor.

== Filmography ==
=== Film ===
Year	Title	Role	Ref.
2008	A Goose's Dream	Tae-gyun	
2009	Wish	Kim Jung-wan	
2011	Detective K: Secret of the Virtuous Widow	Inn man 3	
2013	Miss Cherry's Love Puzzle	Lee Gil-joon	
2013	Friend: The Great Legacy	young Hyung-doo	
2014	The Con Artist	Detective 1	
2015	The Shameless	Shopping mall CEO	
2017	Ordinary Person	Park Dong-gyu	
2019	Svaha: The Sixth Finger	Kim Cheol-jin	
2020	The Swordsman	Musa	
2020	Best Friend	Dong-hyuk	
2022	Hot Blooded	Cheol-jin	
2022	Hot Blood: The Original	Cheol-jin; Extended version	

=== Television series ===
Year	Title	Role	Notes	Ref.
2010	OB & GY	Cameo		
2013	Reply 1994	Cameo		
2014	More Than a Maid	Duk-goo		
2016	Descendants of the Sun	Ahn Jung-joon		
2016	The Gentlemen of Wolgyesu Tailor Shop	Hong Gi-pyo		
2017	Judge vs. Judge	Choi Kyung-ho		
2018	Mr. Sunshine	Song Young		
2018	Lovely Horribly	Sa Dong-chul		
2019	Search: WWW	Oh Jin-woo		
2019	My Country: The New Age	Park Chi-do		
2020	Team Bulldog: Off-Duty Investigation	Tak-won		
2020	The Good Detective	Yoo Jong Seok	Season 1	
2020	Drama Special	Lim Sang-hyun	Episode: "Crevasse"	
2021	Love Scene Number	Woo Woon-bum	Episode: "Love Scene #42"	
2021	Hello, Me!	Yang Do-yoon		
2021	You Are My Spring	Seo Ha-neul		
2021	Jirisan	Kim Nam-sik	Cameo	
2022	Are You Eating and Drinking?	Kwon Dong-hoon	Andong MBC New Year Special Drama	
2022	It's Beautiful Now	young Lee Kyeong-cheol	Cameo	
2022	Why Her	Choi Joo-wan		
2022	Curtain Call	Park Se-jun		
2023	My Dearest	Koo Won-moo		
2023	The Escape of the Seven	Um Ji-man		
2023	The Worst of Evil	Seok Do-hyung		
2023–2024	Korea–Khitan War	Yang Kyu		
2024	Good Partner	Kim Ji-sang		
2025	No Mercy	Ma Seok-gu		

=== Web shows ===
Year	Title	Role	Ref.
2022	디저볼래	Cast member	

== Awards and nominations ==
Name of the award ceremony, year presented, category, nominee of the award, and the result of the nomination
Award ceremony	Year	Category	Nominee / Work	Result	Ref.
Baeksang Arts Awards	2024	Best Supporting Actor – Television	Korea–Khitan War	Nominated	
KBS Drama Awards	2023	Excellence Award, Actor in a Serial Drama	Korea–Khitan War	Won	
KBS Drama Awards	2023	Popularity Award, Actor	Korea–Khitan War	Won	
SBS Drama Awards	2022	Best Supporting Actor in a Miniseries Genre/Fantasy Drama	Why Her	Nominated	
