= Ha Seung-ri =

South Korean actress (born 1995)

- Born: January 9, 1995 (age 31); South Korea
- Other name: Ha Seung Lee
- Occupation: Actress
- Years active: 1999–present
- Agent: ELmedia
- Height: 163 cm (5 ft 4 in)

Korean name
- Hangul: 하승리
- RR: Ha Seungri
- MR: Ha Sŭngni

Ha Seung-ri (born January 9, 1995) is a South Korean actress.

== Career ==
In 1999, at the age of 5, Ha made her debut as Kang Hye-rim in the SBS drama Trap of Youth, which recorded the highest viewership rating of 53.1% at the time.

Ha began transitioning to adult roles with Hwang Young-geon in School 2017 and Sunny Again Tomorrow in 2018. In 2019, Ha starred in the tvN series Search: WWW.

In 2022, Ha appeared as prodigious archer Jang Ha-ri in All of Us Are Dead. She received the nickname "archer senior" (양궁선배; yanggeung seonbae) for the role. In March, it was announced that Ha would model for the 2022 Spring/Summer collection of Day Life. She also appeared in an advertisement for a promotion video for the "Archer" update of Kingdom of the Wind: Kite. In May, Ha was appointed as a public relations ambassador of the Office of Cultural and Sports Promotion alongside Baek Ye-seul.

== Filmography ==
=== Films ===
Year	Title	Role	Ref.
2000	Asako in Ruby Shoes	Woo-in's niece	
2002	Ardor	Soo-jin	
2003	A Man Who Went to Mars	So-hee (young)	
2003	Reversal of Fortune	Child at the park (cameo)	
2005	The Rainy Day	Soo-jin's daughter	
2010	I Saw the Devil	High school girl at the harbor	
2011	Sunny	Ye-bin	
2017	Dead Again	Li-na	

=== Television series ===
Year	Title	Role	Ref.
1999	Trap of Youth	Kang Hye-rim	
1999	Waves		
2000	Legends of Love		
2000	Doctor Doctor		
2000	MBC Best Theater: "Etiquette About Love"	Yeol-mae	
2000	Ajumma		
2000	I Want to Keep Seeing You		
2001	Law of Marriage		
2001	Open Drama Man and Woman: "Santa Dad"	Haeng-soon	
2002	MBC Best Theater: "Until Winter"	Eun-seo	
2002	Glass Slippers	Kim Yoon-hee (young) / Lee Sun-woo	
2002	Whenever the Heart Beats		
2003	MBC Best Theater: "Paper Airplane"	Ha-neul	
2003	Nonstop 3		
2003	Open Drama Man and Woman: "Cool Cool Special Part 1 Eun-ji"	Eun-ji	
2004	The Age of Heroes	Chun Tae-hee (young)	
2004	Drama City: "Our Ham"	Choi Hyun-ji	
2005	My Love Toram	Kim Eun-bi	
2005	Winter Child	Noh Gong-joo	
2006	Yeon Gaesomun	Kim Bo-hee (young)	
2006	Drama City: "Picnic"	Seo Jin-joo	
2007	Bad Woman, Good Woman	Song Jin-ah	
2008	Amnok River Flows	Choi Moon-ho (young)	
2009	What's for Dinner?	Jeong Eunji	
2010	Bread, Love and Dreams	Goo Ja-kyung (young)	
2010	I Am Legend	Jo Eun-ji	
2010	Housewife Kim Kwang-ja's Third Activity	Na Yoo-mi	
2012	Take Care of Us, Captain	Schoolgirl bully (guest)	
2012	I Remember You	Yoo Woo	
2012	Phantom	Jung Mi-young (ep.7–8)	
2012	Happy Ending	Park Na-ri	
2014	Secret Door	Queen Jung-soon	
2015	Unkind Ladies	Kim Hyun-sook (young)	
2015	The Producers	Tak Ye-jin (teens / ep.6,9)	
2015	KBS Drama Special: "Trains Don't Stop at Noryangjin Station"	Jang Yoo-ha	
2015	Second 20s	Ha No-ra (young)	
2016	Rickety Rackety Family	Jung Na-mi	
2016	Secrets of Women	Byun Mi-rae	
2017	Good Manager	Lee Min-ji	
2017	School 2017	Hwang Young-gun	
2018	Sunny Again Tomorrow	Hwang Ji Eun	
2019	Search: WWW	Hong Yoo-jin	
2020	The King: Eternal Monarch	Jang Yeon-ji	
2022	All of Us Are Dead	Jang Ha-ri	
2023	The Villain of Romance	Bun Yujin	
2023	My Lovely Boxer	Jeong Su-yeon	
2023	Arthdal Chronicles: The Sword of Aramun	Chae-eun	
2023–2024	Korea–Khitan War	Queen Wonseong	
2025	Marie and Her Three Daddies	Kang Ma-ri	

=== Variety shows ===
Year	Title	Role	Notes	Ref.
2002	Comedy House	Bon ja	Fixed appearance	
2002–2004	Ding Dong Dang	Seungri	Fixed appearance	
2018	Ranking Show 1,2,3	Guest	Episode 27	
2019	King of Mask Singer	Competitor (Starting School)	Episode 193	
2022	Knowing Bros	Guest	Episode 323	
2022	South Korean Foreigners	Guest	Episode 182	

=== Music video appearances ===
Year	Song	Artist	Ref.
2004	"Tomboy Beep"		
2018	"Stonehenge Beautiful Journey"		
2022	"As It Is" (그냥 편한 사이라도)	Baek Ye-seul	
2022	"I Can't Help It" (어쩔 수가 없나 봐)	Kim Na-young	

== Advertisements ==
Year	Enterprise	Brand	Notes	Ref.
2000	Gyowon Gumon	Kumon Learning		
2000	Samil Pharm	Ibuprofen Syrup		
2022	Dream Walker	Day Life	Fashion model	
2022	Nexon	Country of the Winds: Kite		

== Awards and nominations ==
Name of the award ceremony, year presented, category, nominee of the award, and the result of the nomination
Award ceremony	Year	Category	Nominee / Work	Result	Ref.
Director's Cut Awards	2023	Best New Actress in Television	All of Us Are Dead	Nominated	
