= Princess Yeonchang =

Royal Consort of Goryeo (fl. 11th century)

Princess Yeonchang 연창궁주
- Died: 1048; Goryeo
- Spouse: Jeongjong of Goryeo (died 1046)
- House: No clan (by birth); House of Wang (by marriage)
- Religion: Buddhism

Princess Yeonchang of the No clan (Korean: 연창궁주 노씨; Hanja: 延昌宮主盧氏; d. 1048) was the fifth wife of King Jeongjong of Goryeo

== Biography ==
At first, King Jeongjong heard about her beautiful appearance and seduced by this, then he secretly invited her to enter the palace. Not long after this, she became his most favourite and loved one. Even so, she didn't receive any royal title and after his death, the new king who was his younger brother, Munjong of Goryeo bestowed Yeonchang Palace (연창궁; 延昌宮) as her mansion according to the late king's last wish. Knowing this, almost of Munhaseong (문하성; 門下省) and Eosadae (어사대; 御史臺) refused this and said:

"That Lady No didn't receive any Royal title and the wrong orders of the previous King aren't to be obeyed."
("노씨는 예절을 갖추어 맞아들이지 않았으며, 선왕의 잘못된 명령은 복종할 일이 아닙니다.")

But, Munjong rejected their advice and still bestowed the Yeonchang Palace to her.

Since lived in Yeonchang Palace, she therefore was called as Princess Yeonchang (연창궁주; 延昌宮主), but then died on 16 March 1048.
