= Sŏ Hŭi =

Korean politician and diplomat (942–998)

- Hangul: 서희
- Hanja: 徐熙
- RR: Seo Hui
- MR: Sŏ Hŭi

Courtesy name
- Hangul: 염윤
- Hanja: 廉允
- RR: Yeomyun
- MR: Yŏmyun

Posthumous name
- Hangul: 장위
- Hanja: 章威
- RR: Jangwi
- MR: Changwi

Sŏ Hŭi (Korean: 서희; Hanja: 徐熙; Korean pronunciation: [səːhi]; 942 – 8 August 998) was a Korean politician and diplomat during the early days of the Goryeo period. His art name was Yŏmyun and his posthumous name was Changwi. Sŏ is best remembered for his diplomatic skills that led 60,000 Khitan troops to withdraw from Goryeo.

== Family ==
Sŏ Hŭi was of the Icheon Sŏ clan and was the son of Sŏ P'il who, during the King Gwangjong's reign, served as Secretary-General (내의령; 內議令; naeŭiryŏng), the highest official post of the Department of the Royal Secretariat (내의성; 內議省; naeŭisŏng). Until the time of his grandfather, Sŏ Sin-il, the Sŏ clan was a hojok, or a powerful local gentry clan based in the modern-day Icheon area, in the southeast of Gyeonggi Province.

Like his father, Sŏ Hŭi became a jaesang, the collective term referring to officials with a high rank in ancient Korea. His sons, Sŏ Nul and Sŏ Yu-gŏl (서유걸; 徐惟傑) also followed their father's footstep by serving respectively as Munhasijung, the title of the highest minister of state, and Vice Director of the Left (左僕射), the second rank of Sangseoseong, Secretariat for State Affairs of Goryeo. As one of Sŏ Nul's daughters later became a queen by marrying King Hyeonjong, Sŏ Hŭi's clan would become maternal relatives of the king. With this background and his own talent, Sŏ Hŭi managed to establish a successful career.

Wives and issue(s):

1. Lady of the Cheongju Han clan (부인 청주 한씨)
  1. Sŏ Nul (서눌; ?–1042) – 1st son.
  2. Sŏ Yu-gŏl (서유걸) – 2nd son.
  3. Sŏ Yu-wi (서유위) – 4th son.
2. Unknown woman?
  1. Sŏ Chu-haeng (서주행) – 3rd son.

Ancestry

Sŏ Hŭi had 1 older brother, Sŏ Yŏm (서염; 徐廉) and 1 younger brother, Sŏ Yŏng (서영; 徐英).

Ancestors of Sŏ Hŭi

Mr. Sŏ 서씨
Sŏ Sin-il 서신일
Sŏ Pil 서필
Hong Chan 홍찬
Lady Hwang of the Hapcheon Hong clan 부인 합천 홍씨
Sŏ Hui 서희
Mr. Hwang 황씨
Mr. Hwang 황씨
Lady Hwang of the Pyongyang Hwang clan 부인 평양 황씨

== Career ==
After Sŏ Hŭi passed gwageo, the state examination, with a high grade, in March 960, the 11th year of King Gwangjong's reign, he served for the government as the Gwangpyeongwon eorang (廣評員外郎) and Naeui sirang (內議侍郎) posts. In 983, Sŏ became Byeonggwan eosa (兵官御事), the official in charge of military affairs. Soon after that, he was appointed to important positions like Naesasirang pyeongsangsa (內史侍郎平章事), the second rank of the Chancellory, and finally he was raised to the highest position of Taebo Naesaryeong, the head of Supreme Council. In addition to his role in domestic politics, Sŏ engaged in diplomacy by going to China in 972 and playing an important role in re-establishing the diplomatic relationship between Goryeo and the Chinese Song dynasty, which had been broken off over a decade earlier.

=== Negotiations with Liao ===
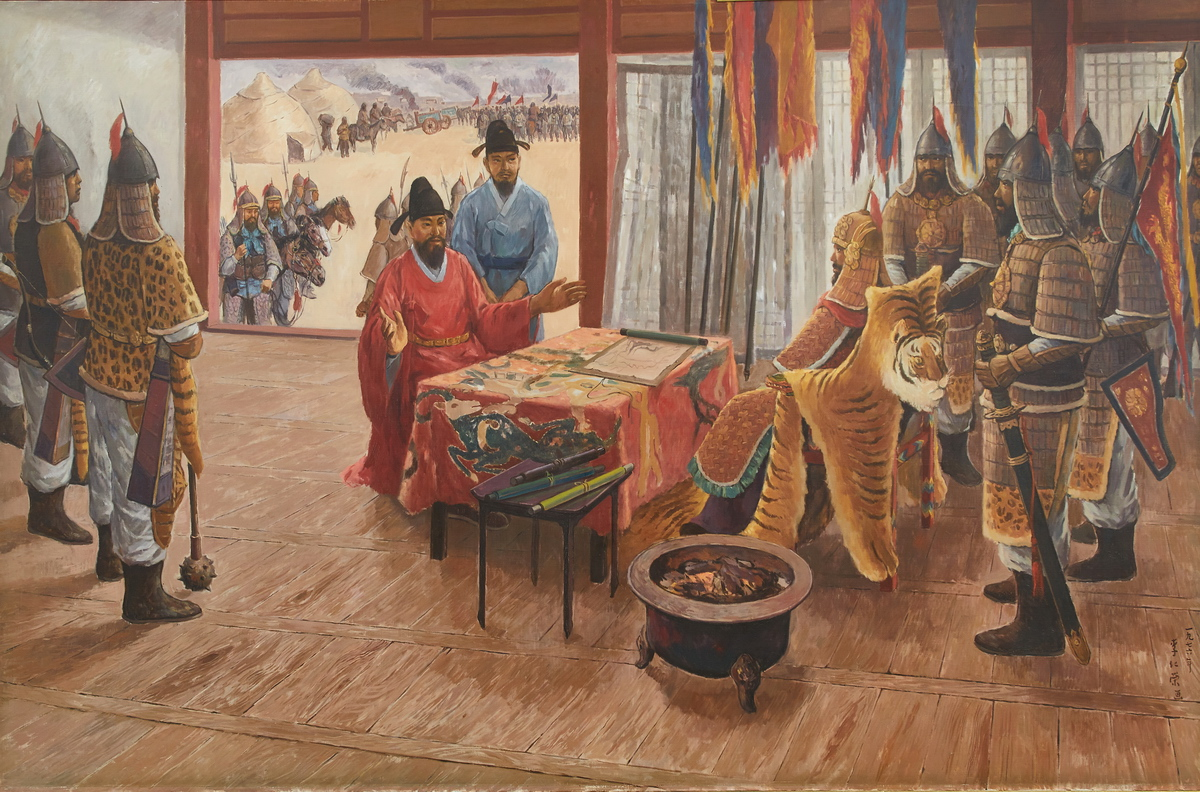
Seo Hui's diplomatic talks

However, he is most remembered in his diplomatic career for his direct negotiations with General Xiao Sunning of the Liao dynasty, which prevented a fullscale invasion by a host of Khitan troops:

According to the story, after Xiao captured Pongsan county in 993 and forced Goryeo's forces to retreat behind the Taedong River, he wrote to demand Goryeo's surrender: "[O]ur great country is about to unify land on all four directions" and to justify the expedition by charging: "your country does not take care of the people's needs, we solemnly execute heaven's punishment on its behalf". King Seongjong of Goryeo initially accepted Liao's demands, planning on the advice of his negotiators to give up the land north of Pyongyang to Xiao and drawing the Liao-Goryeo border in a straight line between Hwangju and P'aryŏng.

Sŏ Hŭi, however, was convinced that the Liao were acting from a position of "fear of us" and begged the king to "return to the capital and let us, your officers, wage one more battle". Sŏ rhetorically referred to the land that King Gwangjong had conquered from the Jurchens and which the Khitans (Liao) now held as "former Koguryŏ territory". After Xiao's forces were repulsed from further advances at the Battle of Anyung Fortress, Sŏ went to the Liao encampment to negotiate a settlement. Part of their conversation is excerpted:

Xiao: Your country arose in Silla territory. Koguryŏ territory is in our possession. But you have encroached on it. Your country is connected to us by land, and yet you cross the sea to serve China. Because of this, our great country came to attack you. If you relinquish land to us and establish a tributary relationship, everything will be all right.

Sŏ: That is not so. Our country is in fact former Koguryŏ, and that is why it is named Koryŏ and has a capital at P'yŏngyang. If you want to discuss territorial boundaries, the Eastern Capital of your country is within our borders.... Moreover, the land on both sides of the Yalu River is also within our borders, but the Jurchens have now stolen it.... If you tell us to drive out the Jurchens, recover our former territory, construct fortresses, and open the roads, then how could we dare not to have [tributary] relations?"

Sŏ reported to his king that he forged an agreement with Xiao to jointly "exterminate the Jurchens" and to seize their land so that Goryeo and Liao would have a closer land border and commensurate tributary relations. He lamented that the Jurchens would only allow Goryeo the land south of the Yalu River, but envisioned a future in which this situation of confinement would change.

Later, Sŏ Hŭi fortified the newly expanded territory, which gave Goryeo a decisive victory in the second and third conflicts after his death.

== Later life and death ==
Sŏ Hŭi died in 998, on the 14th day of the 7th lunar month (8 August 998).

== In popular culture ==
- Portrayed by Han Bum-hee in the 2002–2003 KBS TV series The Dawn of the Empire.
- Portrayed by Im Hyuk in the 2009 KBS2 TV series Empress Cheonchu.

== See also ==
- List of Goryeo people
- Goryeo
- Goryeo-Khitan Wars
