= Princess Hyojeong =

Princess of Goryeo (fl. 11th century)

Princess Jeokgyeong

Princess of Goryeo
- Reign: ?–?
- Successor: Princess Cheonsu
- Monarch: Wang Sun, King Hyeonjong
- Born: 1011; Goryeo
- Died: 1030 (aged 18–19); Goryeo
Posthumous name
- Princess Hyojeong (효정공주, 孝靜/靖公主)
- House: House of Wang (by birth)
- Father: Hyeonjong of Goryeo
- Mother: Queen Wonhwa

Korean name
- Hangul: 적경공주
- Hanja: 積慶公主
- RR: Jeokgyeong gongju
- MR: Chŏkkyŏng kongju

Posthumous name
- Hangul: 효정
- Hanja: 孝靖 or 孝靜
- RR: Hyojeong
- MR: Hyojŏng

Princess Jeokgyeong (1011–1030 (Note: In the Korean calendar (lunisolar), she died on 13th day of the 7th month of 1030.)) or posthumously called Princess Hyojeong, was a Goryeo Royal Princess as the eldest daughter of King Hyeonjong, from his second wife Queen Wonhwa who was the youngest daughter of King Seongjong. There were no records left on her marriage and the location of her tomb.
