= Lady Yeonchang =

Korean consort (fl. 10th century)

Lady Yeonchang 연창궁부인
- 'Grand Lady', of the Nakrang County (낙랑군대부인; 樂浪郡大夫人)
- Born: ? Gyeongju, Gyeongsang Province, Goryeo
- Spouse: Seongjong of Goryeo
- Issue: Queen Wonhwa
- House: Gyeongju Choi (by birth); House of Wang (by marriage)
- Father: Choi Haeng-eon
- Mother: Grand Lady Gim of Pungsan County
- Religion: Buddhism

Lady Yeonchang of the Gyeongju Choi clan (Korean: 연창궁부인 최씨; Hanja: 延昌宮夫人 崔氏) was the third wife of King Seongjong of Goryeo and the mother of Queen Wonhwa.

She came from Gyeongju, Gyeongsang Province as the daughter of Confucianism Scholar Choi Haeng-eon. The Gyeongju Choi family never had marriage relationships with a Goryeo Royal member, so this marriage was unusual at that time. During King Seongjong's reign, he changed the past traditional political structure and actively introduced the Confucian political system to improve the national system. Around 1017, her son-in-law gave his 2nd wife's maternal families, the Gyeongju Choi clan royal titles and ranks, and Choi then known as Grand Lady of the Nakrang County (낙랑군대부인; 樂浪郡大夫人).

== In popular culture ==
- Portrayed by Kim Yoon-hee in the 2009 KBS2 TV series Empress Cheonchu.
