= Queen Yongsin =

Goryeo queen consort (fl. 11th century)

Queen Yongsin 용신왕후

Queen consort of Goryeo
- Tenure: 1035–1036
- Coronation: 1035
- Predecessor: Queen Gyeongseong
- Successor: Queen Yongui
- Died: 1036; Goryeo
- Burial: July 1036; Hyeolleung tomb
- Spouse: Jeongjong of Goryeo (before 1035)
- Issue: Wang Hyeong
Regnal name
- Princess Yeonheung (연흥궁주; 延興宮主; until 1035); Gracious Consort Han (혜비 한씨; 惠妃 韓氏; Hye-Bi; 1035–1035); Princess Consort (Queen) Jeongsin (정신왕비; 定信王妃; 1035–1036)
Posthumous name
- Queen Jeongui Myeongdal Huimok Yongsin 정의명달희목용신왕후 (定懿明達禧穆容信王后)
- House: Danju Han (by birth); House of Wang (by marriage)
- Father: Han-Jo (한조)
- Religion: Buddhism

Queen Yongsin of the Danju Han clan (Korean: 용신왕후 한씨; Hanja: 容信王后 韓氏; d. 1036) or Princess Consort Jeongsin (정신왕비; 定信王妃) was a Korean queen consort as the first wife of Jeongjong of Goryeo.

== Biography ==
=== Biography ===
The future Queen Yongsin was born as the daughter of Han-Jo (한조) and the younger sister of Han-Gyu (한규), also the older sister of her future husband's second wife, Queen Yongui. Not like the other Goryeo queens, she had no any blood-relation with Jeongjong from their initial family and this marriage was just a noble and royal family.

They were married while Jeongjong was still "Prince Pyeongyang" (평양군; 平壤君) and after his ascension to the throne, she became his queen consort and given royal title as Princess Yeonheung (연흥궁주; 延興宮主).

In 1035, she bore Jeongjong a son named Wang-Hyeong (왕형), which she then honoured as Gracious Consort Han (혜비 한씨; 惠妃 韓氏; Hye-Bi) and Princess Consort Jeongsin (정신왕비; 定信王妃) not long after her first promoted.

Meanwhile, in 1036, the Queen died and was buried in "Hyeolleung Tomb" (현릉; 玄陵) with received her full posthumous name in 1048 (2nd year reign of Munjong of Goryeo).

=== Posthumous name ===
- In October 1056 (10th year reign of King Munjong), name Jeong-ui (정의; 定懿) was added.
- In April 1140 (18th year reign of King Injong), name Myeong-dal (명달; 明達) was added.
- In October 1253 (40th year reign of King Gojong), name Hui-mok (희목; 禧穆) was added to her posthumous name too.
