= Icheon Seo clan =

Korean clan from Gyeonggi Province

- Country: Korea
- Current region: Icheon
- Founder: Sŏ Sin-il
- Connected members: Suh Kyung-bae; Sŏ Hŭi; Seo Eunkwang; Seo Youngeun
- Website: icheonseo.com

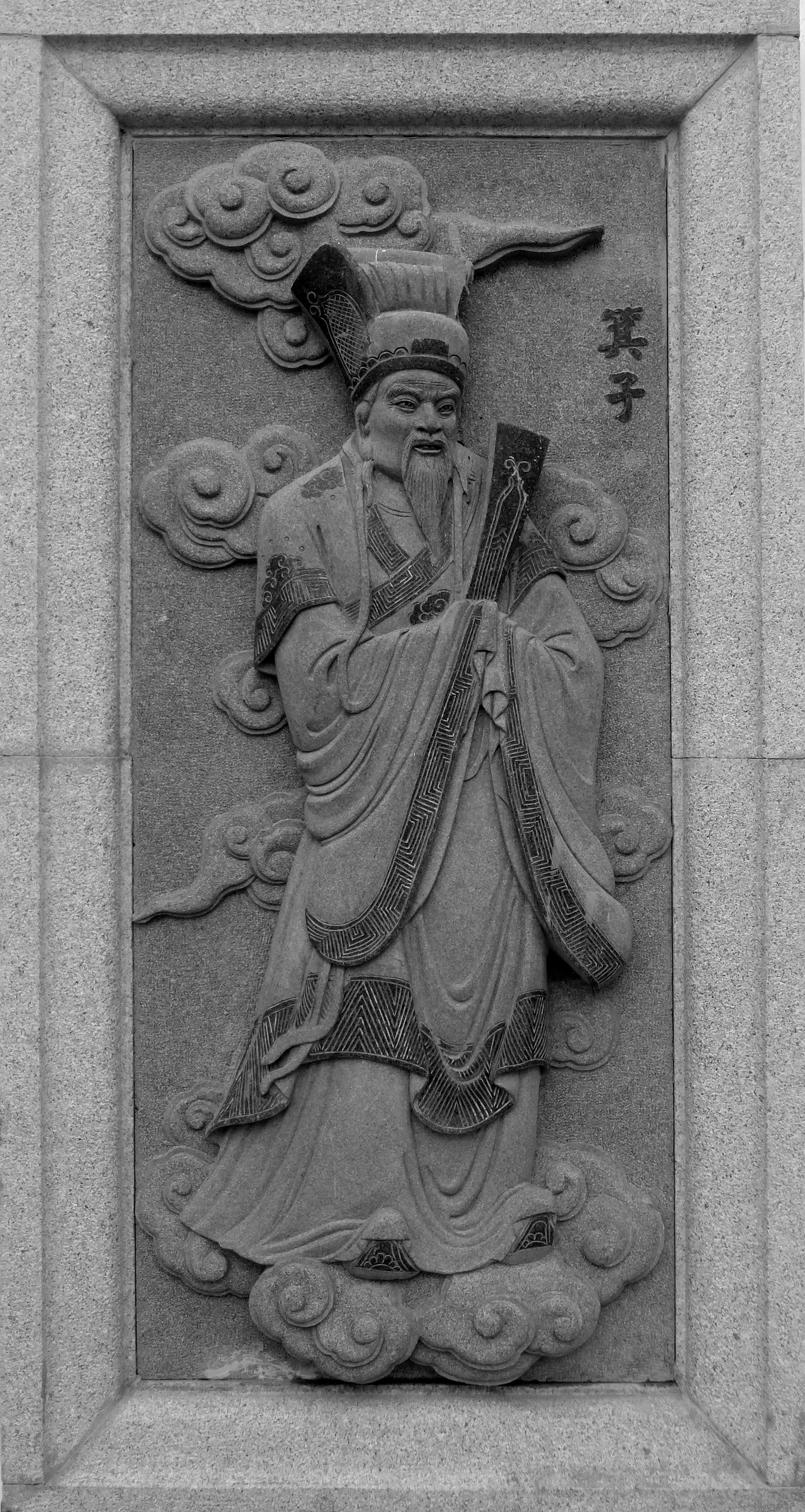
Gija

Icheon Seo clan (Korean: 이천 서씨; Hanja: 利川 徐氏) is one of the Korean clans. Their Bon-gwan is in Icheon, Gyeonggi Province. According to the research held in 2015, the number of Icheon Seo clan was 199792. Their founder was Sŏ Sin-il who was a descendant of King Jun of Gojoseon, the Gojoseon’s last king before Wiman Joseon. He lived at seoaseong (Korean: 서아성; Hanja: 徐阿城) in Icheon. He named their surname after the name of the place “Icheon”.

== See also ==
- Korean clan names of foreign origin
