= Choe Yong-deok =

Goryeo consort (fl. 14th century)

Royal Consort Suk-Bi Choe 숙비 최씨

Royal consort of Goryeo
- Tenure: 1384–1388
- Coronation: 1384
- Predecessor: Royal Consort Ui
- Successor: Royal Consort An
- Born: Yong-deok; Goryeo
- Spouse: U of Goryeo
- House: Choe clan (by birth); House of Wang (by marriage)
- Father: Choe Cheon-geom (최천검)
- Mother: Princess Myeongseon (명선옹주)
- Religion: Buddhism

Royal Consort Suk of the Choe clan (Korean: 숙비 최씨; Hanja: 淑妃 崔氏; fl. 14th century), personal name Choe Yong-deok (최용덕; 崔龍德) was a Korean Royal Consort as the 4th wife of King U of Goryeo.

== Biography ==
Yong-deok, also known as Kayaji (가야지; 加也只), was the daughter of Choi Cheon-geom and his concubine. Born into the nobi class, she worked in the Tongjewon (통제원; 通濟院) before becoming a palace lady in the service of Royal Consort Ui of the No clan. In the 10th year of King U's reign, the king began to visit her daily and lavish more attention on her than her mistress. After court eunuchs pointed out that Yong-deok's home was too small and shabby to host the king, it was arranged that Yong-deok would live in the house of a courtier nearer the palace.

Yong-deok was invested as Royal Consort Suk (숙비; 淑妃) only one month after the king first visited her house. At this time, her father was promoted to the office of the Miljiksa (밀직사; 密直使), her mother was granted the title of "Princess Myeongseon", and her elder sister's husband was promoted to the Panmiljiksasa (판밀직사사; 判密直司事). Soon after his promotion, her father used his position to confiscate other people's homes and take bribes in the form of silks, horses, and slaves.

Yong-deok had not been invested long when she grew jealous of the amount of time the king was spending with another nobi woman, Bong-gai. She told the king that Bong-gai had previously been involved with a courtier, whom the king promptly banished to oversee construction works in the west. Later the same year, one of her father's slaves was beaten by minister Yun Chwi, and Yong-deok complained to the king, which led to Yun being sent to prison and demoted to commoner status.

== Banishment ==
In 1386, Yong-deok lost the king's favour. One day, she had her servant play the geomungo, but they stopped playing as soon as the king arrived. The king grew angry and beat the servant, asking why they had stopped playing. Yong-deok hugged his waist, saying "I've lost the king's favour and have nothing to do, if you keep beating the servant, what else will I have?" King U then punched her in the face. Princess Suknyeong accused the consort and her mother of attempting to manipulate the king through sexual practices, so King U expelled Yong-deok from the palace to her father's house. Her palace staff were imprisoned and interrogated harshly, whilst her father and his wife were also imprisoned and their house confiscated. Shortly after, Yong-deok was banished to Jeonju with her father, and her mother, elder sister, and four servants were executed, despite attempts by several courtiers to save them. One person on their day of execution said that they would be revenged on the one who killed them. The body was displayed in the city, and when King U went to view it, he ordered that it be spread on a cart to accelerate decomposition. The smell reportedly filled the entire street, and people did not dare to go near the body.

== Reinstatement as consort ==
In 1387, Yong-deok was summoned back to Kaesong from Jeonju. Although the Goryeosa does not specify whether her father accompanied her, he appears in a record dated one month later, receiving an appointment as Cheonyang Buwongun (천양부원군; 川陽府院君). King U had a golden statue of the Buddha made for Yong-deok and later pardoned her of all crimes when she fell ill. A residence named Uihyebu (의혜부; 懿惠府) was established for her, and it was furnished in accordance with the arrangements of Queen Mother Myeongdeok's residence.

== After U of Goryeo's deposal ==
In 1388, King U was deposed during a mutiny by the military leader Yi Seong-gye, and his young son by Royal Consort Geun was put on the throne. As the mother of the new king, Royal Consort Geun was permitted to remain in the palace, but Yong-deok and the other consorts were expelled, along with their fathers, to their original homes. A few months later, on the occasion of King Chang's birthday, the remaining fathers of other consorts were released from prison.
