= Queen Yongui =

Queen Yongui 용의왕후

Queen consort of Goryeo
- Tenure: 1040–?
- Coronation: 1040
- Predecessor: Queen Yongsin
- Successor: Queen Yongmok
- Spouse: Jeongjong of Goryeo (m. 1038)
- Issue: Wang Bang; Wang Gyeong; Wang Gae
Regnal name
- Princess Hyeondeok (현덕궁주, 玄德宮主; from 1038); Beautiful Consort Han (여비 한씨, 麗妃 韓氏; Yeo-Bi; 1038–1040); Princess Changseong (창성궁주, 昌盛宮主; 1038–1040)
Posthumous name
- Yongui (용의, 容懿; "Tolerant and Benign")
- House: Danju Han (by birth); House of Wang (by marriage)
- Father: Han-Jo (한조)
- Religion: Buddhism

Queen Yongui of the Danju Han clan (Korean: 용의왕후 한씨; Hanja: 容懿王后 韓氏) was a Korean queen consort as the second wife of Jeongjong of Goryeo and his first wife's younger sister.

She was the daughter of Han-Jo (한조). Like her older sister, her marriage with Jeongjong just a noble and royal family, didn't have a blood-relationship. At first, she was a Palace Maid (궁인; 宮人), but later honoured as Princess Hyeondeok (현덕궁주; 玄德宮主) and lived in Mallyeong Palace (만령궁; 萬齡宮).

Two years after her older sister died, on 1 April 1038, Jeongjong gave her a royal title as Beautiful Consort Han (여비 한씨; 麗妃 韓氏) and Princess Changseong (창성궁주; 昌盛宮主). Later, in February 1040 (6th year reign of Jeongjong), she formally became Queen Consort of Goryeo and bore him 3 sons, but all of her son weren't ascended the throne.
