= Queen Wonjeong =

Goryeo princess (fl. 11th century)

Queen Wonjeong 원정왕후

Princess of Goryeo
- Reign: ?–1009
- Successor: Queen Wonhwa
- Monarch: Wang Chi, King Seongjong

Queen consort of Goryeo
- Tenure: 1009 – 23 April 1018
- Coronation: 1009
- Predecessor: Queen Seonjeong
- Successor: Queen Wonhwa
- Died: 23 April 1018; Hyeondeok Palace, Goryeo
- Burial: Hwareung tomb
- Spouse: Hyeonjong of Goryeo (m. 1009–1018)
Regnal name
- Princess Yeonheung (연흥궁주; 延興宮主); Queen Hyeondeok (현덕왕후; 玄德王后)
Posthumous name
- Queen Uihye Wonjeong 의혜원정왕후 (懿惠元貞王后)
- House: Seonsan Kim clan (official); Wang (agnatic and by marriage)
- Father: Seongjong of Goryeo
- Mother: Queen Munhwa of the Seonsan Kim clan

Queen Wonjeong of the Seonsan Kim clan (Korean: 원정왕후 김씨; Hanja: 元貞王后 金氏; d. 23 April 1018 (Note: In the Korean calendar (lunisolar), she died on 5th day of the 4th month of 1018.)) was a Goryeo princess as the older daughter and child of King Seongjong, from Queen Munhwa who became a queen consort through her marriage with her half first cousin once removed, King Hyeonjong as his first and primary wife. From this marriage, Queen Wonjeong became the seventh reigned Goryeo queen who followed her maternal clan after Queen Seonjeong, her stepsister and predecessor.

In 1009, after Kang Cho led a coup to dethroned King Mokjong and appointed Wang Sun as the new king, she then was chosen to be his first wife and Queen consort. During her lifetime, she was called as Princess Yeonheung (연흥궁주; 延興宮主) and Queen Hyeondeok (현덕왕후; 玄德王后) while lived in the "Hyeondeok Palace" (현덕궁; 玄德宮). A year later, when the Khitans invaded, the king moved to the south and she then follow him as well to Naju. After it was retreated, they then returned to the royal palace.

Meanwhile, on 23 April 1018, she died at her own residence ("Hyeondeok Palace") and was buried in "Hwareung Tomb" (화릉; 和陵). She then received her posthumous name of Won-jeong (원정; 元貞) and Ui-hye (의혜; 懿惠) in 1027 (18th year reign of her husband).

== In popular culture ==
- Portrayed by Park Si-eun and Lee Ra-hye in the 2009 KBS2 TV series Empress Cheonchu
- Portrayed by Lee Si-a in the 2023 KBS2 TV series Korea–Khitan War.
