= Marquess Nangnang =

Korean prince

- Prince of Goryeo
- Born: Wang Kyŏng; Goryeo
- House: Wang
- Father: Jeongjong of Goryeo
- Mother: Queen Yongui of the Danju Han clan
- Religion: Buddhism

Korean name
- Hangul: 왕경
- Hanja: 王璥
- RR: Wang Gyeong
- MR: Wang Kyŏng

Royal title
- Hangul: 낙랑후
- Hanja: 樂浪侯
- RR: Nangnanghu
- MR: Nangnanghu

Marquess Nangnang (Korean: 낙랑후; Hanja: 樂浪侯), personal name Wang Kyŏng (왕경; 王璥) was a Korean Royal Prince as the second son of Jeongjong of Goryeo and Queen Yongui. In 1052 after succeeded the Gaebudongsamsa Sutaebo Gyeomsangseoryeong (개부의동삼사 수태보 겸상서령), he became Marquess Nangnang of the Sangju State (상주국낙랑후) and received 3.000 Sik-eup (식읍), also held the position of Suseonghyeobribongdeokgongsin (수성협리봉덕공신) too.
