= Jeongjong, 10th monarch of Goryeo =

King of Goryeo from 1034 to 1046

Jeongjong 정종 靖宗

King of Goryeo
- Reign: 1034–1046
- Coronation: 1034; Junggwang Hall, Gaegyeong, Goryeo
- Predecessor: Deokjong of Goryeo
- Successor: Munjong of Goryeo
- Born: Wang Hyŏng; 31 August 1018; Yeongyeong Palace, Gaegyeong, Goryeo
- Died: 24 June 1046 (aged 27); Beopun Temple, Gaegyeong, Goryeo
- Burial: Jureung (주릉; 周陵)
- Queen Consort: Queen Yongsin (before 1035) Queen Yongui (m. 1038) Queen Yongmok
- Consort: Princess Yeonheung (m. 1040–1046) Princess Yeonchang
- Issue: Sons: Wang Hyŏng Wang Pang Wang Kyŏng Wang Kae; Daughter: Princess Doae
Posthumous name
- Great King Honghyo Anui Gangheon Yeongnyeol Mungyeong Yonghye 홍효안의강헌영렬문경용혜대왕 (弘孝安毅康獻英烈文敬容惠大王)
Temple name
- Jeongjong (정종; 靖宗)
- House: Wang
- Dynasty: Goryeo
- Father: Hyeonjong of Goryeo
- Mother: Queen Wonseong

- Korean name
- Hangul: 왕형
- Hanja: 王亨
- RR: Wang Hyeong
- MR: Wang Hyŏng

Monarch name
- Hangul: 정종
- Hanja: 靖宗
- RR: Jeongjong
- MR: Chŏngjong

Courtesy name
- Hangul: 신조
- Hanja: 申照
- RR: Sinjo
- MR: Sinjo

Posthumous name
- Hangul: 용혜대왕
- Hanja: 容惠大王
- RR: Yonghye daewang
- MR: Yonghye taewang

Jeongjong (31 August 1018 – 24 June 1046), personal name Wang Hyŏng, was the 10th king of Korea's Goryeo dynasty. He was the second son of King Hyeonjong, and the younger brother of King Deokjong. At the age of four in 1022, he was made Naesaryeong, a position of high rank, and designated the Prince of Pyongyang.

Jeongjong was greatly concerned with national defense, and began constructing fortresses along the northern border in the first year of his reign. In 1037, Goryeo was invaded by the Liao dynasty. In 1044, the Cheolli Jangseong was completed, an enormous wall across northern Korea. Jeongjong also concerned himself with the material support of the army, distributing state land to indigent soldiers in 1036.

Just before his death in 1046, Jeongjong established primogeniture as national law.

== Family ==
- Father: Hyeonjong of Goryeo
  - Grandfather: Anjong of Goryeo
  - Grandmother: Queen Heonjeong of the Hwangju Hwangbo clan
- Mother: Queen Wonseong of the Ansan Kim clan
  - Grandfather: Kim Ŭn-bu
  - Grandmother: Grand Lady of Ansan County of the Gyeongwon Yi clan (안산군대부인 이씨)
- Consorts and their Respective Issue(s):
1. Queen Yongsin of the Danju Han clan
  1. Wang Hyŏng, 1st son
2. Queen Yongui of the Danju Han clan
  1. Wang Pang, Prince Aesang, 2nd son
  2. Wang Kyŏng, Marquess Nakrang, 3rd son
  3. Wang Kye, Marquess Gaeseong, 4th son
3. Queen Yongmok of the Buyeo Yi clan
  1. Princess Doae, 1st daughter
4. Virtuous Consort Yongjeol, of the Gyeongju Kim clan – No issue.
5. Princess Yeonchang of the No clan – No issue.

== See also ==
- List of Korean monarchs
- List of Goryeo people
- Jeongjong, 3rd Monarch of Goryeo

Jeongjong, 10th monarch of Goryeo House of Wang Born: 31 August 1018 Died: 24 June 1046
Regnal titles
Preceded by Deokjong	King of Goryeo; 1034–1046	Succeeded by Munjong
