= Queen Wonhwa =

Goryeo princess (fl. 10th century)

Queen Wonhwa 원화왕후

Princess of Goryeo
- Predecessor: Queen Wonjeong
- Monarch: Wang Chi, King Seongjong

Queen consort of Goryeo
- Tenure: 1011–?
- Predecessor: Queen Wonjeong
- Successor: Queen Wonseong
- Born: 996; Goryeo
- Spouse: Hyeonjong of Goryeo (m.1011)
- Issue: Wang Su; Princess Hyojeong; Princess Cheonsu
Regnal name
- Princess Consort (Queen; 왕비, 王妃) of the Hangchun Hall (항춘전; 恒春殿) → Sangchun Hall (상춘전; 常春殿); Queen Daemyeong (대명왕후; 大明王后)
Posthumous name
- Wonhwa (원화, 元和; "Primary and Harmonious")
- House: Gyeongju Choe clan (official); Wang (agnatic and by marriage)
- Father: Seongjong of Goryeo
- Mother: Lady Yeonchang of the Gyeongju Choe clan

Queen Wonhwa of the Gyeongju Choe clan (Korean: 원화왕후 최씨; Hanja: 元和王后 崔氏; 996–?) was a Goryeo princess as the younger daughter and child of King Seongjong with Lady Yeonchang. She became a queen consort through her marriage with her half first cousin once removed, King Hyeonjong, as his second wife. From this marriage, Queen Wonhwa became the eighth reigned Goryeo queen who followed her maternal clan after Queen Wonjeong, her half-sister.

Upon her marriage in 1011, she was titled as Princess Consort Hangchun (항춘전왕비; 恒春殿王妃) and later honored as Princess Consort Sangchun (상춘전왕비; 常春殿王妃); following her residence after marrying which was "Hangchun Hall" (항춘전; 恒春殿) before the name changed to "Sangchun Hall" (상춘전; 常春殿). She was also known as Queen Daemyeong (대명왕후; 大明王后) while she lived in the "Daemyeong Palace" (대명궁; 大明宮). She also bore Hyeonjong a son and two daughters. In 1010, when the Khitans invaded, she and Hyeonjong went to Naju, South Jeolla Province and after retreated, they returned to Gaegyeong.

In 1017 (8th year reign of King Hyeonjong), her maternal families were given royal titles and ranks, such as her maternal grandfather, Choe Haeng-eon (최행언), was granted a royal position, Sangseojwabokya (상서좌복야; 尙書右僕射); her maternal grandmother, Lady Gim, was given the royal title, "Grand Lady of Pungsan County" (풍산군대부인; 豊山郡大夫人); while her mother, Lady Yeonchang was honoured as "Grand Lady of the Nakrang County" (낙랑군대부인; 樂浪郡大夫人). Her death date is unknown, but she later received Wonhwa (원화; 元和) as her posthumous name.
