= Ansan Kim clan =

Korean clan from Gyeonggi Province

- Country: North and South Korea
- Current region: Ansan, South Korea
- Founder: Kim Kŭng-pil (김긍필)

The Ansan Kim clan (Korean: 안산 김씨; Hanja: 安山 金氏) is a Korean clan that was an aristocratic family from the Goryeo era. They wielded their influence over the country's affairs primarily in the mid-11th century through marriages with the heirs of the kingdom. Three of King Hyeonjong's queens, who reigned from 1009 to 1031, were from this family. The Gyeongwon Yi clan would eventually put an end to this dominance, as Yi Cha-yŏn managed to marry three of his daughters to King Munjong, who reigned from 1046 to 1083. The modern-day Ansan Kim clan has a population of 16,990 in South Korea as of the 2015 census. The progenitor of clan is considered to be Kim Kŭng-pil, the father of Kim Ŭn-bu.
