= Hyeonjong of Goryeo =

King of Goryeo from 1009 to 1031

Hyeonjong 현종 顯宗

King of Goryeo
- Reign: 1009–1031
- Coronation: 1009; Yeonchong Hall, Gaeju, Goryeo
- Predecessor: Mokjong of Goryeo
- Successor: Deokjong of Goryeo
- Born: Wang Sun; 1 August 992; Gaeseong-bu, Goryeo
- Died: 17 June 1031 (aged 38); Junggwang Hall, Gaegyeong, Goryeo
- Burial: Seolleung (선릉; 宣陵)
- Queen consort: Queen Wonjeong (m. 1009; died 1018) Queen Wonhwa (m. 1011–1031) Queen Wonseong (m. 1022; died 1028)
- Consort: Lady Kim (m. 1011; died 1022) Lady Yu (m. 1013–1031) Lady Seo (m. 1022–1031) Lady Kim (m. 1022; died 1028) Pure Consort Kim (before 1024): Noble Consort Wang; Noble Consort Yu; Palace Lady Han; Palace Lady Yi; Palace Lady Park
- Issue: Sons: Wang Heum Wang Su Wang Hyeong Wang Hwi Wang Gi Wang Chung; Daughters: Princess Hyojeong Princess Cheonsu Queen Inpyeong Princess Gyeongsuk Queen Hyosa Princess Hyogyeong Queen Gyeongseong Lady Aji
Posthumous name
- Great King Daehyo Deokwi Dalsa Wonmun (대효덕위달사원문대왕, 大孝德威達思元文大王)
Temple name
- Hyeonjong (현종; 顯宗)
- House: Wang
- Dynasty: Goryeo
- Father: Anjong of Goryeo
- Mother: Queen Dowager Hyosuk

- Korean name
- Hangul: 왕순
- Hanja: 王詢
- RR: Wang Sun
- MR: Wang Sun

Monarch name
- Hangul: 현종
- Hanja: 顯宗
- RR: Hyeonjong
- MR: Hyŏnjong

Courtesy name
- Hangul: 안세
- Hanja: 安世
- RR: Anse
- MR: Anse

Posthumous name
- Hangul: 원문대왕
- Hanja: 元文大王
- RR: Wonmun daewang
- MR: Wŏnmun taewang

Dharma name
- Hangul: 선재
- Hanja: 禪齋
- RR: Seonjae
- MR: Sŏnjae

Hyeonjong (1 August 992 – 17 June 1031), personal name Wang Sun, was the 8th ruler of the Goryeo dynasty of Korea. He was a grandson of the dynastic founder King Taejo. He was appointed by the military leader Kang Cho, whom the King Mokjong had called upon to destroy a plot by Kim Ch'i-yang. During his reign, the Goryeo dynasty fought two wars against the Khitan Liao dynasty. Today Hyeonjong is considered to be among the greatest leaders in Korean history.

== Biography ==
Wang Sun was born On 1 August 992 from an affair between Prince Wang Uk (later posthumously given the temple name Anjong) and his widowed niece, Queen Heonjeong. As a result of the affair, his father, Wang Uk, was exiled and his mother died in childbirth.

Wang Sun was the heir to the childless King Mokjong, however the queen dowager, Queen Dowager Cheonchu, sought to have her child with her lover, Kim Ch'i-yang, as the next king. He was forced to become a monk. Queen Dowager Cheonchu attempted to send assassins to kill Wang Sun, however, the abbot of his temple managed to foil the attempts.

In 1009, the military inspector of Seobukmyeon, Kang Cho, overthrew King Mokjong and installed Wang Sun as the next king of Goryeo. In 1010, the Khitan attacked Goryeo, using the deposition of King Mokjong as a casus belli. Hyeonjong was forced to flee the capital temporarily and with the help of General Kang Kam-ch'an directed the court to move far south to the port city of Naju. Kang Cho attempted to stop the foreign invaders but was defeated in battle and captured. While escaping from the Khitan invasion, Hyeonjong met Kim Un-bu in Gongju, and married his daughter, Queen Wonseong. In the end, Goryeo repulsed the Khitan and forced them to withdraw from the Korean land.

In 1019, when Goryeo continued to refuse to submit or return the northern territories, the Khitan attacked once more. Goryeo generals, including Kang Kam-ch'an, were able to inflict heavy losses on the Khitan army in the Battle of Kwiju. The Khitan withdrew without achieving their demands and never again invaded Goryeo. Both the Liao Dynasty and Goryeo enjoyed a time of peace, and their cultures were at their height.

Meantime, Hyeonjong ordered the compilation of the Tripitaka Koreana, which was 6,000 volumes. It is the act of carving the woodblocks that was considered to be a way of bringing about a change in fortune by invoking the Buddha's help.

== Family ==
- Father: Anjong of Goryeo (고려 안종; 920–996)
  - Grandfather: Taejo of Goryeo (고려 태조; 31 January 877 – 4 July 943)
  - Grandmother: Queen Sinseong of the Gyeongju Kim clan (신성왕후 김씨; 900–?)
- Mother: Queen Heonjeong of the Hwangju Hwangbo clan (헌정왕후 황보씨; 966–993)
  - Grandfather: Daejong of Goryeo (고려 대종; 937–996)
  - Grandmother: Queen Seonui of the Chŏngju Yu clan (선의왕후 유씨; 937–?)
- Consorts and their Respective issue(s):
1. Queen Wonjeong of the Seonsan Kim clan (원정왕후 김씨; 994–1018); half first cousin once removed – No issue.
2. Queen Wonhwa of the Gyeongju Ch'oe clan (원화왕후 최씨; 996–?); half first cousin once removed.
  1. Princess Hyojeong (적경공주; 1011-1030), 1st daughter
  2. Princess Cheonsu (천수전주; 1016–?), 3rd daughter
  3. Wang Su (왕수), 2nd son
3. Queen Wonseong of the Ansan Kim clan (원성왕후 김씨; 995 – 15 August 1028)
  1. Crown Prince Wang Hŭm (왕흠 덕종; 9 June 1016 – 31 October 1034), 1st son
  2. Wang Hyŏng, Prince Pyeongnyang (왕형 정종; 31 August 1018 – 24 June 1046), 3rd son
  3. Queen Inpyeong (인평왕후 김씨; 1023–?), 5th daughter
  4. Princess Gyeongsuk (경숙공주; 1025–?), 6th daughter
4. Queen Wonhye of the Ansan Kim clan (원혜왕후 김씨; 1000 – 31 July 1022)
  1. Wang Hwi, Prince Nakrang (왕휘 문종; 29 December 1019 – 2 September 1083), 4th son
  2. Wang Ki, Duke Pyeongnyang (왕기 평양공; 1021–1069), 5th son
  3. Queen Hyosa (효사왕후 김씨; 1022–?), 4th daughter
5. Queen Wonyong of the Chŏngju Yu clan (원용왕후 유씨; 998–?); half first cousin once removed – No issue.
6. Queen Wonmok of the Icheon Sŏ clan (원목왕후 서씨; 998 – 16 June 1057) – No issue.
7. Queen Wonpyeong of the Ansan Kim clan (원평왕후 김씨; 1005–?)
  1. Princess Hyogyeong (효경공주 ; 1026–?), 8th daughter
8. Pure Consort Wonsun of the Gyeongju Kim clan (원순숙비 김씨; 995–?)
  1. Queen Gyeongseong (경성왕후 김씨; 1015–1086), 2nd daughter
9. Noble Consort Wonjil of the Kaeseong Wang clan (원질귀비 왕씨; 1011–?) – No issue.
10. Noble Consort, of the Yu clan (귀비 유씨; 1000–?) – No issue.
11. Palace Lady Hwon-yeong of the Yangju Han clan (궁인 한훤영; 1000–?)
  1. Wang Ch'ung (왕충; 1025–?), 6th son – became a monk.
12. Palace Lady Yi (궁인 이씨; 1005–?) — No issue.
13. Palace Lady Park (궁인 박씨; 1005–?)
  1. Lady Aji (아지; 1025–?), 7th daughter
14. Han Sang-sik (한상식; 1010–?) — No issue.

== In popular culture ==
- Portrayed by Kim Ji-hoon in the 2009 KBS2 TV series Empress Cheonchu.
- Portrayed by Kim Dong-jun in the 2023 KBS2 TV series Korea–Khitan War.

== See also ==
- History of Korea
- Rulers of Korea
- Second Goryeo-Khitan War
- Third Goryeo-Khitan War
- Tripitaka Koreana

Hyeonjong of Goryeo House of Wang Born: 1 August 992 Died: 17 June 1031
Regnal titles
Preceded by Mokjong	King of Goryeo; 1009–1031	Succeeded by Deokjong
