= Kim Ŭnbu =

Goryeo official (968–1017)

- Hangul: 김은부
- Hanja: 金殷傅
- RR: Gim Eunbu
- MR: Kim Ŭnbu

Kim Ŭnbu (Korean: 김은부; Hanja: 金殷傅; 968 – June 11, 1017) was a Korean official who served the Goryeo dynasty and was a powerful in-law of King Hyeonjong. As the patriarch of the Ansan Kim clan, Kim forged familiar relationships with the ruling House of Wang as well as the Gyeongwon Yi clan.

== Biography ==
Kim Unbu was from Ansan, and was the son of Kim Kŭng-pil. Kim was married to Lady Yi, the daughter of Yi Hŏ-gyŏm, the progenitor of the Gyeongwon Yi clan. Kim served as the military governor (절도사; 節度使) of Gongju. In 1011, while King Hyeonjong was fleeing the Khitan invaders, he visited Gongju and was courteously received by Kim. In return for the favour, the king took Kim's three daughters as his consorts, making Kim an influential and powerful royal in-law. In 1015, he was promoted to chijung ch'usa (지중추사; 知中樞事). The year after, he was promoted to the Minister of Revenue (호부상서; 戶部尙書; Hobusangsŏ). On June 11, 1017 he died.

== In popular culture ==
- Portrayed by Hwang Bum-shik in the 2009 KBS2 TV series Empress Cheonchu.
- Portrayed by Jo Seung-yeon in the 2023 KBS2 TV series Korea–Khitan War.
