= Deokjong of Goryeo =

King of Goryeo from 1031 to 1034

Deokjong 덕종 德宗

King of Goryeo
- Reign: 1031–1034
- Coronation: 1031; Junggwang Hall, Gaegyeong, Goryeo
- Predecessor: Hyeonjong of Goryeo
- Successor: Jeongjong of Goryeo
- Born: Wang Hŭm; 9 June 1016; Yeongyeong Palace, Gaeseong-bu, Gaegyeong, Goryeo
- Died: 31 October 1034 (aged 18); Yeonyeong Hall, Gaegyeong, Goryeo
- Burial: Sukneung (숙릉; 肅陵)
- Queen Consort: Consort Gyeongmok (m. 1031–1034) Queen Gyeongseong (m. 1034–1034): Queen Hyosa
- Concubine: Lady Yi; Lady Yu
- Daughter: 2
Posthumous name
- Great King Seonhyo Gangmyeong Gwangjang Gyeonggang 선효강명광장경강대왕 (宣孝剛明廣章敬康大王)
- House: Wang
- Dynasty: Goryeo
- Father: Hyeonjong of Goryeo
- Mother: Queen Wonseong

Korean name
- Hangul: 왕흠
- Hanja: 王欽
- RR: Wang Heum
- MR: Wang Hŭm

Monarch name
- Hangul: 덕종
- Hanja: 德宗
- RR: Deokjong
- MR: Tŏkchong

Courtesy name
- Hangul: 원량
- Hanja: 元良
- RR: Wonryang
- MR: Wŏllyang

Posthumous name
- Hangul: 경강대왕
- Hanja: 敬康大王
- RR: Gyeonggang daewang
- MR: Kyŏnggang taewang

Deokjong (9 June 1016 – 31 October 1034), personal name Wang Hŭm, was the 9th king of the Goryeo dynasty of Korea. The son of King Hyeonjong, he was confirmed as Crown Prince in 1022. During his reign, the compilation of national histories that was started during King Hyeonjong's reign was completed, and under the advice of General Kang Kam-ch'an the construction of the second Cheolli Jangseong began.

After ascending the throne in 1031, Deokjong requested that the Liao dynasty return their Goryeo prisoners and pull back from the Yalu River. After this request was refused, he turned to fortifying the northern frontier.

== Family ==
- Father: Hyeonjong of Goryeo
  - Grandfather: Anjong of Goryeo
  - Grandmother: Queen Heonjeong of the Hwangju Hwangbo clan
- Mother: Queen Wonseong of the Ansan Kim clan
  - Grandfather: Kim Ŭn-bu
  - Grandmother: Grand Lady of Ansan County of the Gyeongwon Yi clan (안산군대부인 이씨)
- Consorts and their respective issue(s):
1. Queen Gyeongseong of the Gyeongju Kim clan; half younger sister – No issue.
2. Worthy Consort Gyeongmok, of the Kaesong Wang clan
  1. Princess Sanghoe, 1st daughter, died young
3. Queen Hyosa of the Ansan Kim clan; half younger sister – No issue.
4. Lady, of the Buyeo Yi clan – No issue.
5. Lady, of the Chungju Yu clan – No issue.
6. Unknown
  1. 2nd daughter, married Wang Chung

== See also ==
- List of Korean monarchs#Goryeo
- List of Goryeo people

Deokjong of Goryeo House of Wang Born: 9 June 1016 Died: 31 October 1034
Regnal titles
Preceded by Hyeonjong	King of Goryeo; 1031–1034	Succeeded by Jeongjong
