= Sunbi No =

Goryeo queen consort (1343–1394)

Royal Consort Sun 순비

Queen consort of Goryeo
- Tenure: 1389–1392
- Coronation: 1389
- Predecessor: Queen Consort Yi
- Successor: Dynasty abolished (Queen Sindeok as the first Queen Consort of Joseon)
- Born: 1343; Gyeongsan, Goryeo
- Died: 1394 (aged 51); Joseon
- Spouse: Gongyang of Goryeo (m. 1363–1394)
- Issue: Prince Jeongseong; Princess Suknyeong; Princess Jeongsin; Princess Gyeonghwa
- House: Gyoha No (by birth); Kaeseong Wang (by marriage)
- Father: No Jin, Prince Changseong
- Mother: Consort Myeongui of the Namyang Hong clan

Royal Consort Sun of the Gyoha No clan (Korean: 순비 노씨; Hanja: 順妃 盧氏; 1343–1394) was a Korean queen consort as the primary and only wife of King Gongyang of Goryeo. She was the fifth (last) Goryeo queen consort who didn't receive a posthumous name like the other queen consorts following Lady Yi.

In 1389, following her husband ascended the throne as King Gongyang by the Yi Seong-gye's powerful clan, she also officially become the Queen consort in 1389. The new king then established the "Department of Justice" (의덕부) and placed a bureaucracy for his wife's family, the No clan (노씨). They later had a son and three daughters. Around 1392, along with her husband, they were dethroned and exiled to Wonju, Goseong, and Samcheok.

In 1394, after receiving an apology from Yi, they were judged together by the new court. There was a theory said that the two committed suicide by jumping into the water. They were then buried in the same tomb at Wondang, Gyeonggi Province and Samcheok, Gangwon Province.

== Family ==
- Father
  - No Jin, Prince Changseong (창성군 노진; 盧稹; 1304–1376)
- Mother
  - Consort Myeongui of the Namyang Hong clan (명의비 남양 (당홍계) 홍씨, 明懿妃 南陽 洪氏; 1305 – ?)
- Sibling(s)
  - Older sister - Lady No of the Gyoha No clan (교하 노씨; 1325 – ?)
  - Older brother - No Seon (노선; 盧瑄; 1327 – ?)
  - Older brother - No Suk (노숙; 盧璹; 1329 – ?)
  - Older brother - No Nae (노내; 盧匂; 1331 – ?)
- Husband
  - King Gongyang of Goryeo (고려 공양왕; 9 March 1345 – 17 May 1394)
- Issue
  - Daughter - Princess Suknyeong (숙녕궁주; 1364 – ?)
  - Daughter - Princess Jeongsin (정신궁주; 1366–1421)
  - Daughter - Princess Gyeonghwa (경화궁주; 1368 – ?)
  - Son - Wang Seok, Prince Jeongseong (왕석 정성군; 1370–1394)

== In popular culture ==
- Portrayed by Park Hye-sook in the 1983 KBS TV series Foundation of the Kingdom.
- Portrayed by Kim Young-ae in the 1983 MBC TV series The King of Chudong Palace.
- Portrayed by Kang Gyeong-hun in the 1996–1998 KBS TV series Tears of the Dragon.
