= Gyeonghwa =

Gyeonghwa or Kyunghwa (경화) may refer to:

- Lady Gyeonghwa (경화궁부인)
- Princess Gyeonghwa (Gongyang) (경화궁주)
- Queen Gyeonghwa (경화왕후)
- Princess Gyeonghwa (경화공주)
- Kyung-hwa (경화) (Korean given name)
- Yu Kyung-hwa (유경화)
- Sung Kyung-hwa (성경화)
- Park Kyung-hwa (박경화)
- Kim Kyong-hwa (김경화)
- Kyung Wha Chung (정경화)
- Kyunghwa Lee (이경화)
- Han Kyeong-hwa (한경화)
- Kang Kyung-wha (강경화)
- Gyeonghwa Station (경화역)
