= Princess Jeongsin =

Princess of Goryeo (fl. 14th to 15th centuries)

Princess of Goryeo
- Reign: 1390–1392
- Coronation: 1390
- Predecessor: Princess Suknyeong
- Successor: Princess Gyeonghwa
- Monarch: Wang Yo, King Gongyang
- Born: 1366; Goryeo
- Died: 1421 (aged 55); Joseon
- Spouse: Woo Seong-beom, Prince Danyang (m. 1390–1392)
- Issue: Lady Woo
- House: House of Wang (by birth); Danyang Woo clan (by marriage)
- Father: Gongyang of Goryeo
- Mother: Royal Consort Sun of the Gyoha No clan
- Religion: Buddhism

Princess Jeongsin (Korean: 정신궁주; 정신공주; Hanja: 貞信宮主; 貞信公主; 1366–1421) was a Goryeo Royal Princess as the second daughter of King Gongyang and Royal Consort Sun.

== Biography ==
On 17 April 1390, she was honoured as Princess Jeongsin (정신궁주; 貞信宮主) along with her sisters, then married with Woo Seong-beom (우성범) whom later honoured as Prince Danyang (단양군). However, in July 1392, after Yi Seong-Gye's ascension to the throne and made the new dynasty, Woo was sentenced to death and was beheaded along with Gang Hoe-gye (강회계), her younger brother-in-law.

Woo Seong-beom came from the Danyang Woo clan (단양 우씨; 丹陽 禹氏) who was the eldest son of Woo Hong-su (우홍수) and the grandson of Woo Hyeon-bo (우현보). With Woo, she had one issue, a daughter. While the Princess's father-in-law tried to conspired, it was failed and died after being executed by Taejo's royal troops in 23 August.

== Family ==
- Father - King Gongyang of Goryeo (고려 공양왕; 9 March 1345 – 17 May 1394)
- Mother - Royal Consort Sun of the Gyoha No clan (순비 노씨; 1343–1394)
- Siblings
  - Older brother - Wang Seok, Prince Jeongseong (왕석 정성군; 1362–1394)
  - Older sister - Princess Suknyeong (숙녕궁주; 1364–?)
  - Younger sister - Princess Gyeonghwa (경화궁주; 1368–?)
- Husband - Woo Seong-beom (우성범; 禹成範; 1374 – 31 July 1392)
- Issue
  - Daughter - Woo Gye-in (우계인), Lady Woo of the Danyang Woo clan (1391–?)
