= Kyung-hwa =

- Hangul: 경화
- RR: Gyeonghwa
- MR: Kyŏnghwa

Kyung-hwa, also spelled Kyung-wha, Kyong-hwa, or Gyeonghwa, is a Korean given name.

People with this name include:

Sportspeople

- Yu Kyung-hwa (born 1953), South Korean Olympic volleyball player
- Sung Kyung-hwa (born 1965), South Korean team handball player and Olympic champion
- Park Kyung-hwa (born 1984), South Korean swimmer
- Kim Kyong-hwa (born 1986), North Korean football player

Other

- Kyung-wha Chung (born 1948), South Korean violinist
- Kyunghwa Lee (born 1968), South Korean-born American performing artist
- Han Kyeong-hwa (born 1977), South Korean voice actress
- Kang Kyung-hwa, South Korean diplomat, United Nations Deputy High Commissioner for Human Rights

== See also ==
- List of Korean given names
