= Woo (Korean surname) =

Korean family name (우)

- Pronunciation: /u/

Origin
- Origin: Korean
- Meaning: Different depending on Hanja

Other names
- Alternative spelling: U

- Woo
- Hangul: 우
- Hanja: 禹; 于
- RR: U
- MR: U
- IPA: [u]

Woo is an uncommon Korean surname.

== Clans ==
Woo may be written with either of two hanja (禹 and 于). Each has one bon-gwan: for the former, Danyang, North Chungcheong Province, and for the latter, Mokcheon-eup (목천읍), Dongnam-gu, Cheonan, South Chungcheong Province, both in what is today South Korea. The 2000 South Korean census found 180,141 people with these family names. In a study by the National Institute of the Korean Language based on 2007 application data for South Korean passports, it was found that 97.0% of people with this surname spelled it in Latin letters as Woo in their passports, while only 1.6% spelled it as Wu. Rarer alternative spellings (the remaining 1.4%) included U and Wo.

== People with the surname ==
- Queen U (d. 234), queen consort of Goguryeo
- U Hakyu (d. 1179), Goryeo general
- U Tak (1262–1342), Korean Confucian scholar during the Goryeo dynasty
- U Tong-chuk (born 1942), North Korean politician
- Woo Bum-kon (1955–1982), South Korean police officer and spree killer (responsible for the Uiryeong massacre)
- Woo Chul (born 1978), South Korean swimmer
- Woo Do-hwan (born 1992), South Korean actor
- Woo Eun-joung, South Korean taekwondo practitioner
- Woo Eun-kyung (born 1962), South Korean basketball player
- Woo Ha-ram (born 1998), South Korean diver
- Woo Hee-jin (born 1975), South Korean actress
- Woo Hee-young (born 1963), South Korean footballer
- Woo Hye-rim (born 1992), South Korean singer, former member of girl group Wonder Girls
- Woo Hye-mi (stage name Miwoo, 1988–2019), South Korean singer
- Hyo-Won Woo (born 1974), South Korean composer
- Woo Hyun (born 1964), South Korean actor
- Woo Hyun-jung (born 1977), South Korean former field hockey player
- Woo In-hee (c. 1940–1981), North Korean actress and mistress of Kim Jong-il
- Woo Jang-chun (1898–1959), Korean botanist
- Woo Ji-ho (stage name Zico, born 1992), South Korean rapper, record producer, member of boy group Block B
- Woo Ji-hyun (born 1986), South Korean actor
- Woo Ji-won (born 1973), South Korean basketball player
- Woo Jin-won (stage name Masta Wu, born 1978), South Korean rapper
- Woo Jin-yong (born 1986), CrossFit and snowboard athlete
- Woo Jin-young (born 1997), South Korean singer and rapper
- Woo Joo-sung (born 1993), South Korean footballer
- Kevin Woo (born 1991), South Korean-American singer, television host, former member of boy group U-KISS
- Kyu Sung Woo (born 1941), South Korean architect
- Meredith Jung-En Woo (born 1958), South Korean-born American political scientist
- Woo Mi-hwa (born 1974), South Korean actress
- Woo Sang-ho (born 1962), South Korean activist and politician
- Woo Sang-ho (born 1992), South Korean footballer
- Woo Sang-hyeok (born 1996), South Korean high jump athlete
- Woo Sang-kwon (1926–1975), South Korean footballer and coach
- Woo Seung-jae (born 1986), South Korean wrestler
- Woo Seung-je (born 1982), South Korean footballer
- Woo Seung-yeon (1983–2009), South Korean actress
- Woo Sun-hee (born 1978), South Korean handball player
- Sung J. Woo (born 1971), South Korean-born American writer
- Woo Sung-yong (born 1974), South Korean footballer
- Woo Won-jae (born 1996), South Korean rapper
- Woo Won-shik (born 1957), Speaker of the National Assembly of South Korea
- Woo Yong-gak (1929–2012), North Korean commando held in South Korea as one of the unconverted long-term prisoners

== See also ==
- Danyang Woo clan
- List of Korean family names
