= Gu Juksan An clan =

Korean clan from Gyeonggi Province

(Old) Juksan Ahn clan
- Country: Korea
- Current region: Anseong
- Founder: Ahn Jun (Hanja: 安濬); Ahn Yeong-ui (Hanja: 安令儀)
- Connected members: Royal Consort Jeong-bi

(New) Juksan Ahn clan (Korean: 구 죽산 안씨; Hanja: 舊 竹山 安氏) was one of the Korean clans. Their Bon-gwan was in Anseong, Gyeonggi Province. According to the Korean census in 2015, the number of the (new) Juksan Ahn clan was 77,026. It has been told that (new) Juksan Ahn clan's founder was An Pangjun who came over from Tang dynasty to Silla in 807. However, according to Ssijogwonryu (Hanja: 氏族源流), it has been found that the (new) Juksan Ahn clan ‘s founder was Ahn Jun (Hanja: 安濬) and Ahn Yeong-ui (Hanja: 安令儀). Genealogies of Ahn Jun (Hanja: 安濬) and Ahn Yeong-ui (Hanja: 安令儀) are still unknown. Not to be confused with another Juksan Ahn clan, whose founder is Ahn Bang-jun.

== Connected Members ==
- Royal Consort Jeong-bi — concubine of King Gongmin
- Royal Consort Hyeon-bi — concubine of King U, paternal niece of Royal Consort Jeong-bi
- Ahn Maeng-dam — husband of Princess Jeongui, second daughter of Queen Soheon and King Sejong
- Princess Consort Yeongwon — wife of Yi Yeom, Prince Hwisun, the fifth son of King Seongjong
- Ahn Hong-ryang — son-in-law of Yi Hu, Prince Shinseong, the fourth son of King Seonjo

== See also ==
- Korean clan names of foreign origin
