= Princess Bongnyeong =

Korean princess (fl. 13th–14th centuries)

- Grand Consort of the Three Han State (삼한국대비; 三韓國大妃)
- Spouse: Prince Jeongwon; sixth cousin
- Issue: Prince Jeongyang; Prince Jeongchang
Regnal name
- Grand Consort Jaye Jeongmyeong Ikseong Saje Hyedeok of the Three Han State 자예정명익성사제혜덕삼한국대비 慈睿貞明翼聖思齊惠德三韓國大妃 (given by King Gongyang in 1390)
- House: House of Wang (by birth and marriage)
- Father: Wang Hun, Prince Yeondeok
- Mother: Lady Jo, Consort Anui
- Religion: Buddhism

Korean name
- Hangul: 복녕궁주
- Hanja: 福寧宮主
- Revised Romanization: Bongnyeong Gungju
- McCune–Reischauer: Pongnyŏng Kungju

Honorary Title
- Hangul: 삼한국대비
- Hanja: 三韓國大妃
- Revised Romanization: Samhanguk Daebi
- McCune–Reischauer: Samhanguk Taebi

Princess Bongnyeong, better known as Grand Consort Wang (Korean: 국대비 왕씨; Hanja: 國大妃 王氏), was a Goryeo royal family member and the great-granddaughter of King Chungnyeol who became the wife of Prince Jeongwon and mother of King Gongyang.

== Biography ==
=== Palace life ===
After King Chang's deposition in 1389, her second son, Wang Yo, Prince Jeongchang was chosen to succeed the throne under Yi Sŏng-gye's powerful clan and then, she was honoured as Princess Bongnyeong (복녕궁주; 福寧宮主). In 1390, a government office was established for her with the name of "Sungnyeong-bu" (숭녕부), then lived in "Jeongmyeong Hall" (정명전; 貞明殿) while received her honorary title as Grand Consort of the Three Han State (삼한국대비; 三韓國大妃).

It was said that King Gongyang more respected to his biological mother than his adopted mother, Consort Dowager An if seeing that the King didn't greet An, but just greet her, his biological mother, which made the servants suggested that he must also send greetings to An. In 1391, a large amnesty was granted on her birthday while Yi Sung-in (이숭인), Ha Ryun and Kwŏn Kŭn were pardoned to live freely outside the capital city of Namgyeong. They then went back to Gaegyeong after stayed for some time in "Namgyeong" (now in Seoul).

Then, some Posthumous titles were placed on the three-generation ancestors of her, An and Gongyang's wife, Lady No. According to an appeal filed by Yi Cheom, Wang was said to still in good health and free from disease.

=== Later life ===
Since 1392 after her grandson, Crown Prince Wang Seok returned to Goryeo, there was no record left about her existence anymore. According to King Gongyang's age who now was already 48 years old, so it was presumed that if she was still alive, then her age will be older than 60.

== Family ==
- Father: Wang Hun, Great Prince Yeondeok (연덕부원대군 왕훈; 定原府院君 王鈞)
  - Grandfather: Wang Ja, Duke Gangyang (강양공 왕자, 江陽公 王滋; d. 1308)
    - Great-grandfather: Wang Geo, King Chungnyeol (충렬왕 왕거, 忠烈王 王昛; 1236–1308)
    - Great-grandmother: Princess Jeonghwa (정화궁주, 貞和宮主; d. 1319)
- Mother: Lady Jo, Consort Anui (안의비 조씨)
