= Royal Consort Ik-Bi =

Goryeo queen consort (fl. 14th century)

Royal Consort Ik-Bi Han 익비 한씨

Royal consort of Goryeo
- Tenure: 1366–1374
- Coronation: 1366
- Predecessor: Royal Consort Hye
- Successor: Royal Consort Jeong
- Born: 1340; Goryeo
- Died: Unknown
- Spouse: Gongmin of Goryeo (m. 1366; died 1374)
- Issue: a daughter (illegitimate)
- House: House of Wang (by birth); Han clan (by marriage)
- Father: Wang Ui, Prince Deokpung

- Royal Consort Ik-Bi
- Hangul: 익비 왕씨; 익비 한씨
- Hanja: 益妃 王氏; 益妃 韓氏
- RR: Ikbi Wangssi; Ikbi Hanssi
- MR: Ikpi Wangssi; Ikpi Hanssi

Royal Consort Ik of the Gaeseong Wang (Han) clan (Korean: 익비 왕씨 (한씨); Hanja: 益妃 王氏(韓氏); 1340 – ?) was the 4th wife of her eleventh cousin, King Gongmin of Goryeo as they were same descents from King Hyeonjong and Queen Wonhye.

== Marriage and palace life ==
In October 1366 (15th year reign of Gongmin), he took Wang as his Queen Consort since he didn't have any issue from his first marriage. Then, in December, she became Ik-Bi (익비; 益妃) and was given the new surname Han (한씨; 韓氏). Later in May 1367, along with Consort Ahn, they went to Gorari (고라리; 高羅里) and watched Gyeoggu Game (격구놀).

However, in 1373 (21st year reign of King Gongmin), his first wife, Princess Noguk died which reportedly mentally unbalanced him. He then ordered members of the Jajewi ('Noble Youth Guards'), an elite group of young and handsome men, to have sex with his consorts to impregnate them. At this time, Gracious Consort Yi, Consort Yeom and Consort Ahn refused the order. Ik-Bi also refused it, but Gongmin threatened her with a sword so she was forced to have relationships with Han Ahn (한안), Hong Ryun (홍륜), Gwon Jin (권진), Hong Gwan (홍관) and No Seon (노선) under Gongmin's watch. After this, the men often went to her chamber at night under the pretext of fulfilling the King's order. However, Yun Ga-gwan (윤가관) along with two other self-defense committee members disobeyed the King's command and became delinquents for a while.

It is written in the Life of Hong Ryoun (Hong Ryun) that in 1374, the eunuch Choi Man-Seng (최만생) reported to King Gongmin that Consort Ik was in her fifth month of pregnancy. The King was greatly pleased by this, and asked who was the father. When he learned that it was Hong Ryun, he told the eunuch that he would now have to kill him and the entire group of Jajewi men in order to keep the secret of her baby's paternity. Choi reported this to Hong's group and later, on 22 September, they assassinated Gongmin in his sleep. Hong was eventually assassinated by Yi In-im (이인임) related forces and then Ik-Bi gave birth to their daughter on 1 October (lunar calendar).

In 1390 (2nd year reign of King Gongyang), the former consort (Ik-Bi) was given land by the king after she raised his youngest daughter, Princess Gyeonghwa at her own mansion.

== Family ==
- Father - Wang Ui, Internal Prince Deokpung (왕의 덕풍부원군; 1320 – ?)
  - Grandfather - Wang Geo, Grand Prince Hwaui (왕거 화의대군; 1280 – ?)
- Husband - Wang Jeon, King Gongmin (고려 공민왕; 23 May 1330 – 27 October 1374)
  - Father-in-law - Wang Man, King Chungsuk (고려 충숙왕; 30 July 1294 – 3 May 1339)
  - Mother-in-law - Queen Gongwon of the Namyang Hong clan (공원왕후 홍씨; 25 August 1298 – 12 February 1380)
- Issue
  - Illegitimate daughter - Lady Hong of the Namyang Hong clan (남양 홍씨; 1374 – ?); conceived by Hong Ryun (홍륜, 洪倫; ? – 1374)
    - Son-in-law - Kim Taek-jeong (김택정; 金澤精) of the Gimhae Kim clan (김해 김씨)
      - Grandson - Kim Deok-ryeong (김덕령; 金德齡)

== In popular culture ==
=== TV series ===
- Portrayed by Lee Ji-eun in the 2005 MBC TV series Shin Don.
- Portrayed by Lee So-yoon in the 2014 KBS1 TV series Jeong Do-jeon.

=== Film ===
- Portrayed by Song Ji-hyo in the 2008 South Korean Movie A Frozen Flower.
