= Prince Jeongyang =

Goryeo prince (fl. 14th century)

- Born: Wang U Gaegyeong-si, Goryeo
- Died: 23 March 1397; Hanseong-bu, Joseon
- Spouse: Lady, of the Gyoha No clan
- Issue: Wang Jo; Wang Gwan; 3 daughters
Regnal name
- Internal Prince Jeongyang (정양부원군, 定陽府院君; given in 1389 by King Gongyang); Given in 1392 by King Taejo: Prince Majeon (마전군; 麻田郡); Prince Gwi of Ui (귀의군; 歸義君)
Posthumous name
- Gyeonghui (경희; 景禧)
- House: House of Wang
- Father: Prince Jeongwon
- Mother: Princess Boknyeong
- Religion: Buddhism, later Confucianism

Korean name
- Hangul: 왕우
- Hanja: 王瑀
- RR: Wang U
- MR: Wang U

Royal title
- Hangul: 정양군
- Hanja: 定陽君
- RR: Jeongyanggun
- MR: Chŏngyanggun

Posthumous name
- Hangul: 경희
- Hanja: 景禧
- RR: Gyeonghui
- MR: Kyŏnghŭi

Prince Jeongyang (Korean: 정양군; Hanja: 定陽君; d. 23 March 1397 (Note: In the Korean calendar (lunisolar), he died on 24th day of the 2nd month of 1397.)), personal name Wang U (왕우; 王瑀) was the only full older brother of King Gongyang and nobleman in the early Joseon dynasty since his two daughters married both of King Taejo's son and grandson.

When King U and King Chang were deposed from the throne and their families were exiled, U led the army and stationed in Jangdan near Gaeseong to prepare for emergencies. Then, after his brother's ascension to the throne, he was promoted into Panmunhaseongsa (판문하성사; 判門下省事), Yeongsansasa (영삼사사; 領三司事) and Jongbusisa (종부시사; 宗簿寺事) and in 1391, he became Yeongmunhabusa (영문하부사; 領門下府事).

One year later, Yi Seong-gye established the new Joseon dynasty and King Gongyang's families were exiled, but since U's daughters married both of Yi's son and grandson, so he escaped from the riots while honoured as both of Prince Majeon (마전군; 麻田郡) and Prince Gwi of Ui (귀의군; 歸義君) at Angam Temple (앙암사; 仰庵寺) in Majeon-gun, Gyeonggi Province (now Misan-myeon, Yeoncheon County, Gyeonggi Province) where the Goryeo royal ancestor rites were held by him and his descendants. Taejo was said to enjoyed Gyeokgu (격구; 擊毬) with U and explained him why he given the Joseon royal title (it wasn't that Taejo forgive him because they were in-law, but Taejo said that it was like that honoured Mija from the Ju State to Song State ('주나라에서 미자를 송나라에 봉한 것과 같다'). Also, his sons were changed their clan into maternal one (No clan).

In 1394, U became a target for the treason case of the Wang clan which several officials insisted that he and his two sons got exiled or killed. However, King Taejo pardoned them every time on the grounds that they had to hold the Goryeo ancestral rite. After U's death in 1397 amid continued impeachment, the King personally sent a tribute and gave him a posthumous name.

== Family ==
Sources:

- Wife: Lady, of the Gyoha No clan (부인 교하노씨; 夫人 交河盧氏) – daughter of No-Yeong, Prince Sinyang (신양군 노영; 信陽君 盧瑛).
  - 1st son: Wang Jo, Prince Jeonggang/Prince Gwi of Ui (정강군/귀의군 왕조, 定康君/歸義君 王珇; d. 1398) – later changed into No Jo (노조; 盧珇).
  - 2nd son: Wang Gwan (왕관, 王琯; d. 1398) – later changed into No Gwan (노관; 盧琯).
  - 1st daughter: Lady Wang (부인 왕씨; 夫人 王氏) – married Yi Bang-beon, Grand Prince Muan (무안대군 이방번, 撫安大君 李芳蕃; 1381–1398) of the Jeonju Yi clan.
  - 2nd daughter: Lady Wang (부인 왕씨; 夫人 王氏) – married Sim-Jeong (심정, 沈泟; d. 1418) of the Cheongsong Sim clan.
  - 3rd daughter: Lady Wang (부인 왕씨; 夫人 王氏) – married Sin Ja-geun (신자근; 申自謹).
  - 4th daughter: Lady Wang (부인 왕씨; 夫人 王氏) – married Yi Deok-geun, Prince Sunnyeong (순녕군 이덕근, 順寧君 李德根; d. 1412) of the Jeonju Yi clan.
