= Hye-bi Yi =

Goryeo royal consort (fl. 14th century)

Royal Consort Hye-Bi Yi 혜비 이씨

Royal consort of Goryeo
- Tenure: 1359–1374
- Coronation: 1359
- Successor: Royal Consort Ik
- Born: Unknown; Gyeongju, Goryeo
- Died: 3 February 1408; Hanseong, Joseon
- Spouse: Gongmin of Goryeo (m. 1359; died 1374)
Regnal name
- Princess Hyehwa (혜화궁주, 惠和宮主; 1392 – 3 February 1408)
- House: Gyeongju Yi clan
- Father: Yi Che-hyŏn, Internal Prince Gyerim
- Mother: Lady Pak
- Religion: Buddhism

Korean name
- Hangul: 혜비 이씨
- Hanja: 惠妃 李氏
- Revised Romanization: Hyebi Issi
- McCune–Reischauer: Hyebi Issi

Princess Hyehwa (Joseon Royal Title)
- Hangul: 혜화궁주
- Hanja: 惠和宮主
- Revised Romanization: Hyehwa Gungju
- McCune–Reischauer: Hyehwa Kungju

Dharma name
- Hangul: 호월
- Hanja: 湖月
- Revised Romanization: Howol
- McCune–Reischauer: Howŏl

Royal Consort Hye of the Gyeongju Yi clan (Korean: 혜비 이씨; Hanja: 惠妃 李氏; d. 3 February 1408) was the 3rd wife of King Gongmin of Goryeo. She was known with her Dharma name as Ho-wol (호월; 湖月) and her new title as Princess Hyehwa (혜화궁주; 惠和宮主) given by Taejo of Joseon in 1392.

== Biography ==
=== Background ===
The future Royal Consort Hye was born in Gyeongju as the daughter of Yi Che-hyŏn who was a Goryeo politician, philosopher, writer, and poet.

=== Marriage and Palace life ===
In April 1359 (8th year of the reign of King Gongmin), his Queen Consort, Princess Noguk (who had not provided him with a successor) together with several other ministers asked the King to choose a concubine from a noble family. After being chosen, Yi was given the consort title Gracious Consort (혜비; 惠妃). However, when she entered the palace, it was said that the Queen became jealous of her and refused to eat.

In October 1372 (21st year of King Gongmin), the king selected some young and handsome men and then ordered Han An (한안) and Hong Ryun (홍륜) from the Self-Defense Committee to have sex with his consorts.

After King Gongmin was assassinated in 1374, Hye-bi Yi shaved her hair and became a Buddhist monk in Jeongeopwon (now Cheongryong Temple, 청룡사). Even after King Gongmin's death, the court still respected all of his widowed consorts and continued to provide their daily necessities. In December 1388, this ceased.

=== Later life ===
Hye-bi Yi had a long life, living up to the early Joseon dynasty established by Yi Sŏng-gye. She was then honoured as Princess Hyewa (혜화궁주; 惠和宮主). Taejong of Joseon gave her 30 sŏk of rice and beans and 100 volumes of copies paper (종이 100권). Hye-bi Yi become the abbess in charge of the Buddhist Jeongeopwon Temple. She died on 3 February 1408, this being 12 years after the Goryeo period ended.

After her death, she was succeeded in the position of abbess by Lady Sim. King Taejo and Queen Sindeok's 2nd son, Grand Prince Uian, was the husband of Lady Sim (부인 심씨).

=== Ancestry ===
Ancestors of Hye-bi Yi

Yi Haek 이핵
Yi Chin 이진
Lady Kim of the Gimhae Kim clan 부인 김해 김씨
Yi Che-hyŏn, Internal Prince Gyerim 이제현 계림부원군
Pak In-yuk 박인육
Grand Lady Pak of Jinhan State 진한국대부인 박씨
Royal Consort Hye-Bi Yi 혜비 이씨
Mr. Pak 박씨
Pak Kŏ-sil 박거실
Lady Pak of Suchun State 수춘국부인 박씨

== In popular culture ==
- Portrayed by Kim Ji-young in the 1983 MBC TV series The King of Chudong Palace.
- Portrayed by Jo Nam-Gyeong in the 1983 KBS TV series Foundation of the Kingdom.
- Portrayed by Moon Jeong-hee in the 2005–2006 MBC TV series Shin Don.
- Portrayed by Min Dan-Bi in the 2014 KBS TV series Jeong Do-jeon.
