= Juksan An clan =

Korean clan from Gyeonggi Province

Juksan Ahn clan
- Country: Korea
- Current region: Anseong
- Founder: An Pangjun
- Connected members: An Jeong-Bi; Ahn Byong-man; An Pangjun; Ahn Nae-sang

Juksan Ahn clan (Korean: 죽산 안씨; Hanja: 竹山 安氏) is one of the Korean clans. Their Bon-gwan was in Anseong, Gyeonggi Province. According to the research held in 2015, the number of Juksan Ahn clan’s member was 77026. Their founder was An Pangjun who was Yi Won (Hanja: 李瑗)'s eldest son, and An Pangjun came to Silla from Tang dynasty in 807. Aejang of Silla ordered An Pangjun to handle Wokou and bestowed Ahn surname on An Pangjun. Then, An Pangjun was settled in Silla and founded Juksan Ahn clan.

== See also ==
- Korean clan names of foreign origin
