= Prince Jeongwon (Goryeo) =

Goryeo prince (fl. 13th – 14th centuries)

- Born: Wang Gyun; Goryeo
- Spouse: Princess Boknyeong
- Issue: Prince Jeongyang; Prince Jeongchang
Regnal name
- Prince Jeongwon (정원군; 定原君); Count Jeongwon (정원백; 定原伯; given in 1356); Internal Prince Jeongwon (정원부원군; 定原府院君; given in 1358); Grand Duke Inhyo of the Three Han State (삼한국"인효대공", 三韓國"仁孝大公"; given after his 2nd son's ascension in 1389)
- House: House of Wang
- Father: Wang Yu, Marquess Sunhwa
- Mother: Lady, of the Icheon Sin clan
- Religion: Buddhism

Korean name
- Hangul: 왕균
- Hanja: 王鈞
- RR: Wang Gyun
- MR: Wang Kyun

Royal title
- Hangul: 정원군, later 정원부원군
- Hanja: 定原君, later 定原府院君
- RR: Jeongwongun, later Jeongwonbuwongun
- MR: Chŏngwŏn'gun, later Chŏngwŏnbuwŏn'gun

Posthumous name
- Hangul: 인효
- Hanja: 仁孝
- RR: Inhyo
- MR: Inhyo

Prince Jeongwon (Korean: 정원군; Hanja: 定原君) or formally called as Internal Prince Jeongwon (정원부원군; 定原府院君), personal name Wang Gyun (왕균; 王鈞) was a Goryeo Royal family member as the great-great-great-grandson of Duke Yangyang who became the father of the last monarch, Gongyang. One year later, Gyun went again to Yuan to receive Eoju (어주; 御酒) and while back, he was given the title of Count Jeongwon (정원백; 定原伯). In 1355, he went to the Yuan dynasty along with Gim Jin (김진) and went to "Harye Temple" (하례사) in Yuan in 1358 and after back became Buwongun.

== Ancestry ==
Ancestors of Prince Jeongwon (Goryeo)

Wang Yeong, Marquess Seowon 왕영 서원후 (Note: Posthumously honoured as Duke Yeongheon of the Byeonhan State (변한국영헌공).)
Wang Bun, Marquess Ikyang 왕분 익양후
Lady Hwangbo 부인 황보씨 (Note: Posthumously honoured as Consort Sunan of the Byeonhan State (변한국순안비).)
Wang Yu, Marquess Sunhwa 왕유 순화후 (Note: Posthumously honoured as Duke Inhye of the Mahan State (마한국인혜공).)
Lady Miryang Bak 부인 밀양박씨 (Note: Posthumously honoured as Consort Janggyeong of the Jinhan State (진한국장경비).)
Internal Prince Jeongwon 정원부원군
Lady Icheon Sin 부인 이천신씨 (Note: Posthumously honoured as Consort Myeongye of the Mahan State (마한국명예비).)
