= Yi Chehyŏn =

Korea Goryeo scholar (1287–1367)

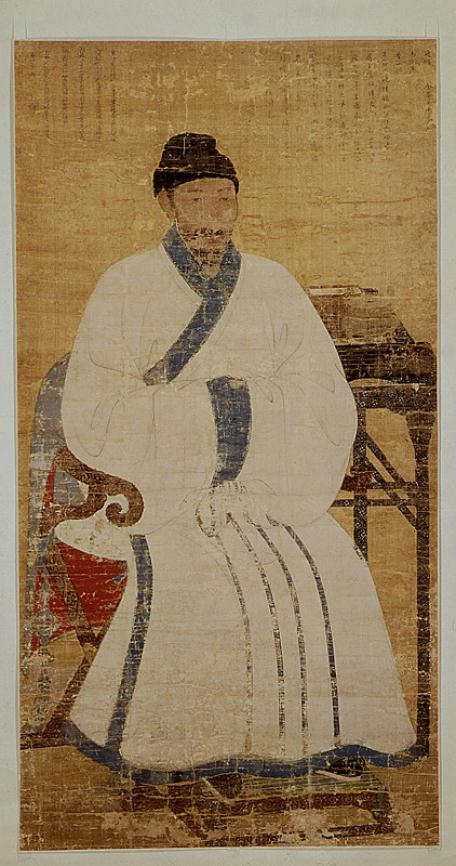
- Portrait of Yi Chehyŏn

Korean name
- Hangul: 이제현
- Hanja: 李齊賢
- RR: I Jehyeon
- MR: I Chehyŏn

Art name
- Hangul: 익재, 역옹, 실재
- Hanja: 益齋, 櫟翁, 實齋
- RR: Ikjae, Yeokong, Siljae
- MR: Ikchae, Yŏgong, Silchae

Courtesy name
- Hangul: 지공
- Hanja: 之公
- RR: Jigong
- MR: Chigong

Posthumous name
- Hangul: 문충
- Hanja: 文忠
- RR: Munchung
- MR: Munch'ung

Yi Chehyŏn (Korean: 이제현; Hanja: 李齊賢; 28 January 1288 – 24 August 1367 (Note: In the Korean calendar (lunisolar), he was born on 24 December 1287 and died on 29 July 1367)) of the Gyeongju Yi clan, was a Goryeo politician, Neo-Confucian scholar, philosopher, writer and poet. He was the follower and disciple of Paek Ijŏng, and the father of Royal Consort Hye-bi, consort of King Gongmin.

== Works ==
=== Books ===
- Ikjaenango: 17 poems of Goryeo songs were translated and published in Korean, they are a valuable resource for the study of Goryeo songs today.
- Ikjaejip
- Yeokongpaeseol
- Hyohaengrok
- Guksa: incomplete relic
- Ungeumrugi

=== Arts ===
Gimadogangdo (lit. 'Horse riding across the river')

=== Legacy ===
- Portrait of Yi Jehyeon – National Treasure No. 110 and Chungcheongbuk-do Cultural Heritage No. 72
- Gangjingugoksasojangikjaeyijehyeonsanggwabaeksayihangboksang – Jeollanam-do Cultural Heritage No. 189
- Gasansasojangikjaeyeongjeong – Jeollanam-do Cultural Heritage No. 164
- Ikjaeyeongjeong – Gyeongsangbuk-do Cultural Heritage No. 90

== Family ==
- Father
  - Yi Chin (1244–1321)
- Mother
  - Grand Lady Park of the Jinhan State
- Siblings
  - Older brother - Yi Kwan
  - Younger brother - Yi Chijŏng
- Wives and their issue(s):
  - Lady Kwŏn of Kilch'ang State (1288–1332)
    - Son - Yi Sŏjong
    - Son - Yi Taljon (1313 – 24 July 1340)
    - Unnamed son; died young
    - Daughter - Lady Yi of the Gyeongju Yi clan
    - Daughter - Lady Yi of the Gyeongju Yi clan
    - Daughter - Princess Ŭihwa, Lady Yi of the Gyeongju Yi clan
    - Daughter - Lady Yi of the Gyeongju Yi clan; died young
  - Lady Suchun of the Pak clan
    - Son - Yi Ch'angno
    - Daughter - Royal Consort Hye-bi of the Gyeongju Yi clan (? – 29 February 1408)
      - Son-in-law - Wang Chŏn, King Gongmin of Goryeo (23 May 1330 – 27 October 1374)
    - Daughter - Lady Yi of the Gyeongju Yi clan
    - Daughter - Lady Yi of the Gyeongju Yi clan
  - Princess Consort Sŏwŏn of the Sŏ clan
    - Daughter - Lady Yi of the Gyeongju Yi clan
    - Daughter - Lady Yi of the Gyeongju Yi clan
  - Unnamed concubine
    - Daughter - Lady Yi of the Gyeongju Yi clan
    - Daughter - Lady Yi of the Gyeongju Yi clan

== In popular culture ==
- Portrayed by Kim Kil-ho in the 1983 TV series Foundation of the Kingdom.
- Portrayed by Song Jae-ho in the 2005–2006 TV series Sin Don.
- Portrayed by Song Min-hyung in the 2012 TV series Faith.
