= Princess Gyeonghwa (Gongyang) =

Princess of Goryeo
- Reign: 1390–1392
- Coronation: 1390
- Predecessor: Princess Jeongsin
- Successor: Dynasty abolished (Princess Gyeongsin as the first Princess of Joseon)
- Monarch: Wang Yo, King Gongyang
- Spouse: Gang Hoe-gye, Prince Jinwon (m. 1391–1392)
- House: House of Wang (by birth); Jinju Gang (by marriage)
- Father: Gongyang of Goryeo
- Mother: Royal Consort Sun of the Gyoha No clan
- Religion: Buddhism

Princess Gyeonghwa (Korean: 경화궁주; 경화공주; Hanja: 敬和宮主; 敬和公主) was a Goryeo Royal Princess as the third and youngest daughter of King Gongyang and Royal Consort Sun. Following the establishment of the new Joseon dynasty, Princess Gyeonghwa became the last Goryeo Royal Princess (born from Queen).

== Biography ==
=== Early life ===
As a child, the Princess was raised by one of King Gongmin's widowed consorts, Lady Han, in her own house and because of this, Lady Han was given lands by the Princess's father, King Gongyang of Goryeo.

=== Marriage ===
In 1390, she was honored as Princess Gyeonghwa (경화궁주; 敬和宮主) along with her sisters, and married Gang Hoe-gye, Prince Jinwon (강회계 진원군) in August that same year.

Gang Hoe-gye was the son of Gang Si (강시) from the Jinju Gang clan (진주 강씨; 晉州 姜氏), and also the younger brother of Gang Hoe-baek (강회백). Gang become Prince Jinwon (진원군) in August after his marriage with the Princess.

=== Aftermath ===
However, in July 1392, after Yi Seong-Gye's ascension to the throne and establishing a new dynasty, Gang was sentenced to death and was beheaded along with Woo Seong-beom (우성범), the Princess's second older brother-in-law.

Meanwhile, her father-in-law, Gang Si was ordered to be executed on 29 May 1397, but then later died on 13 November 1400 (2nd year reign of Jeongjong of Joseon) at the age 62 years old and given a posthumous name Gongmok (공목; 恭穆). Meanwhile, all of her family (father, mother, sisters and brother) were exiled to Samcheok in 1394, but it was not said whether the Princess also got exiled or not. After the fall of the Goryeo period, the Princess's existence was unknown since there were no records left about her whereabouts.

== Family ==
- Father - Wang Yo, Gongyang of Goryeo (고려 공양왕; 9 March 1345 – 17 May 1394)
- Mother - Royal Consort Sun of the Gyoha No clan (순비 노씨; 1343 – 1394)
- Sibling(s)
  - Older Brother - Wang Seok, Prince Jeongseong (정성군; 1362 – 1394)
  - Older sister - Princess Suknyeong (숙녕궁주; 1364 — ?)
  - Older sister - Princess Jeongshin (정신궁주; 1366 – 1421)
- Husband - Kang Hoe-gye, Prince Jinwon (진원군 강회계; 姜淮季; ? – 1392) — No issue.
