= Crown Prince Jeongseong =

Wang Seok

Prince Jeongseong (정성군; 定城君)
- Reign: 1388–1389
- Coronation: 1388

Crown Prince of Goryeo
- Reign: 1389 – July 1392
- Coronation: 1389
- Predecessor: Crown Prince Wang Jeong
- Successor: Dynasty abolished (Yi Bangu as the first Crown Prince of Joseon)
- Monarch: King Gongyang (father)
- Born: Wang Dan; 1370; Goryeo
- Died: 1394 (aged 24); Samcheok, Gangwon Province, Joseon
- Spouse: Crown Princess Consort of the Incheon Yi clan (m. 1391–1394)
- House: House of Wang
- Father: Gongyang of Goryeo
- Mother: Royal Consort Sun of the Gyoha No clan
- Religion: Buddhism

Korean name
- Hangul: 왕석
- Hanja: 王奭
- RR: Wang Seok
- MR: Wang Sŏk

Royal title
- Hangul: 정성세자
- Hanja: 定城世子
- RR: Jeongseong seja
- MR: Chŏngsŏng seja

Former names
- Hangul: 왕서, 왕단
- Hanja: 王瑞, 王瑞
- RR: Wang Seo, Wang Dan
- MR: Wang Sŏ, Wang Tan

Crown Prince Jeongseong (ca. 1370–1394) or known before as Prince Jeongseong, was the first son of King Gongyang and Consort Sun who would eventually become the last Crown Prince of the Goryeo dynasty. After Yi Seonggye established the new dynasty, he was deposed from his throne along with his parents and got assassinated. His birth name was Wang Dan (왕단; 王瑞), but later changed to Wang Seok (왕석; 王奭) whom he was better known as.

== Biography ==
=== Early life ===
Born as Wang Dan (왕단; 王瑞), he was the only son of Wang Yo, Prince Jeongchang and Lady No. Then, he changed his name into "Seok" (석; 奭) and given royal title as Prince Jeongseong (정성군; 定城君) in 1388. Although his birth date was not clear, but it seems that he was born before 1388 since in that year he already held a royal title. One year later, following his father who ascended the throne under General Yi Seong-gye's command after deposed King Chang, Jeongseong then became the Crown Prince (왕세자; 王世子).

=== Palace life and marriage ===
In 1390, Seoyeon was opened, a "Sabu" (사부; 師傅) and a "Sihak" (시학; 侍學) were appointed and received Confucian education, there were also Jo Jun (조준) and Yi Seo (이서). The Crown Prince was said to engrossed in Buddhism and on 4 February 1391, he went to "Hoeam Temple" (회암사), where he and his parents prayed all night long. In the next day, Seok offered 1,200 linens (1,200필) to the monks.

On 20 February 1391, there was a selection held for Crown Princess Consort (세자빈 간택) and the chosen one was Yi Won-goeng (이원굉)'s daughter from the Incheon Yi clan (인천 이씨). Not long after that, the King gave her a dignitary as her gifts and the white crown bows. Lady Yi then became the Crown Princess Consort (왕세자빈; 王世子嬪) not long after their marriage in the same year.

Meanwhile, after a year since the King decided to move the capital to Hanyang, he changed to Gaegyeong after deciding again. Wang Seok then visited "Yangneung" (양릉; 陽陵) and made a sacrifice in Hyosinjeon Hall (효신전; 孝愼殿) to announce the move back to the capital to Gaegyeong.

In March, Bongsungdogam (봉숭도감) was installed and he then followed the Crown Prince's Ceremony (세자 책봉례). However, his father tried to enforce the Ceremony inconsistent with the etiquette, so Gim Ja-su (김자수), an ambassador from Seonggyungwan, took issue with it. Finally, the Ceremony was postponed to August. Then, on 15th, the King delivered the Crown Prince's seal to Wang Seok through Seol Jang-su (설장수), a priest from Chanseong Temple (찬성사) and a feast was held after the ceremony. On the 25th, they announced that Seok already became the Crown Prince.

=== Affairs with the Ming dynasty ===
Meanwhile, the Crown Prince was said to be distracted by the issue of joining and made alliance with the Ming dynasty. There were voices of concern that the Ming mightn't rebuke him. The Ming sent their first envoy in April after King Gongyang ascended the throne and demanded that 10,000 horses (1만필) be sold in Goryeo, but Goryeo could not meet the number and only sent 1,500 horses in June (1,500필만). At this time, Wang was reprimanded for not meeting the deadline after sending them to the Ming Dynasty, but there was no way for him to respond. Meanwhile, merchants who traded sheep were participating in the envoy to Ipjo and the ambassadors, such as Heo Eung (허응) filed an appeal in September, insisted that the merchants be excluded from the party.

From September until December, Wang, along with Seol Jang-su (설장수) and others, were left in Ming and went back to Goryeo. On 10 March 1392, while Yi Hyeon (이현; 李玄) already arrived in Goryeo and reported the Crown Prince's expected return date, Wang then returned safely on the 26th and greeted the new year, and receiving a golden robes (금직문기의복; 金織文綺衣服).

He was loved by the Ming's Emperor and he treated him to a western tea while honouring Wang as "Marquess" (후; 侯) and "Duke" (공; 公), this made the Emperor also hold banquets and feasts five times for several days during the Civil War and was given away the 2 Jeong (2정, 錠) gold, 10 jeong (10정) silver, and 100 pieces of silks (견단 100필) for him.

While he returned home in the following years, he was welcomed by the Goryeo official who came out in Sodae Gate (서대문), Gaegyeong. However, all of Ming's gifts given to him, were returned to the national treasury by himself and it was said that he stole some of it, and secretly bought a gun and gave it to his lover. In April, Wang went back to Jeokgyeong-won (적경원; 積慶園) in Hyosinjeon Hall and then met Yi Seong-gye in Hwangju. But the next day, he visited Yi again who was injured after falling off a horse while hunting.

=== Deposition from the throne and death ===
In July 1392, Yi Seong-gye eventually deposed King Gongyang and following this, Wang then became Deposed Crown Prince (폐세자; 廢世子) while they exiled to Wonju, they later were moved to Goyang, Gyeonggi Province. On 4 March 1394, they were moved again to Samcheok and were executed there. Yi, who was now the new King of the new Joseon dynasty, reported this news to the Ming and after received this news, the Ming finally understood that Wang didn't return safely to Goryeo and instead got killed.

== Family ==
- Father: King Gongyang of Goryeo (고려 공양왕; 9 March 1345 – 17 May 1394)
- Mother: Consort Sun of the Gyoha No clan (순비 노씨; 1343–1394)
- Younger sister: Princess Suknyeong (숙녕궁주; 1364–?)
- Younger sister: Princess Jeongsin (정신궁주; 1366–1421)
- Younger sister: Princess Gyeonghwa (경화궁주; 1368–?)
- Wife: Crown Princess Consort of the Incheon Yi clan (왕세자빈 인천 이씨; 1370–?) – No issue.

Crown Prince Jeongseong House of Wang
Regnal titles
Preceded by Crown Prince Wang Jeong	Crown Prince of Goryeo; 1389–1392	Succeeded by Dynasty abolished
