= Jeongbi An =

Goryeo consort (1352–1428)

Royal Consort Jeong-Bi of the Juksan Ahn clan 정비 안씨

Royal consort of Goryeo
- Tenure: 1366–1374
- Coronation: 1366
- Predecessor: Royal Consort Ik
- Successor: Royal Consort Sin

Grand consort of Goryeo
- Tenure: c.1374/5–1388
- Coronation: c.1374/5
- Predecessor: Grand Consort Hong
- Monarch: King U

Royal Grand consort of Goryeo
- Tenure: c.1388–1392
- Coronation: c.1388
- Monarch: King Chang; King Gongyang
- Born: 1352; Jukju, Yanggwang Province, Goryeo
- Died: 26 June 1428 (age 75-76); Yangju, Yanggwang Province, Joseon
- Spouse: Gongmin of Goryeo (m. 1366; died 1374)
Regnal name
- Grand Consort Ahn (Dae-bi; 대비 안씨, 大妃 安氏; during King U's reign); Royal Grand Consort Ahn (Wang-dae-bi; 왕대비 안씨, 王大妃 安氏; during King Chang's reign); Royal Grand Consort Jeongsuk Seonmyeong Gyeongsin Ikseong Yuhye 정숙선명경신익성유혜왕대비 貞淑宣明敬信翼成柔惠王大妃 (given by King Gongyang in 1390); Princess Uihwa (의화궁주; 義和宮主; 7 December 1392 – 1428)
- House: Juksan Ahn (by birth); House of Wang (by marriage)
- Father: Ahn Geuk-in, Prince Jukseong
- Mother: Lady Yi of the Gari Yi clan
- Religion: Buddhism

Royal Consort Jeong of the Juksan Ahn clan
- Hangul: 정비 안씨
- Hanja: 定妃 安氏
- RR: Jeongbi Anssi
- MR: Chŏngbi Anssi

Princess Uihwa
- Hangul: 의화궁주
- Hanja: 義和宮主
- RR: Uihwa gungju
- MR: Ŭihwa kungju

Dharma name
- Hangul: 덕월
- Hanja: 德月
- RR: Deokwol
- MR: Tŏgwŏl

Royal Consort Jeong of the Juksan Ahn clan (Korean: 정비 안씨; Hanja: 定妃 安氏; 1352 – 16 June 1428 (Note: In the Korean calendar (lunisolar), the consort died on 14 May 1428)) was the 5th wife of King Gongmin of Goryeo. She was also known by her Dharma name as Deok-wol (Korean: 덕월; Hanja: 德月) and by her new royal title as Princess Uihwa (Korean: 의화궁주; Hanja: 義和宮主) given by Taejo of Joseon in 1392.

She has been spoken of as a tragic figure among the women of the Later Goryeo dynasty.

== Biography ==
=== Marriage and palace life ===
In October 1366 (15th year reign of Gongmin), he took Ahn as his Queen Consort as he didn't have any issue from his first marriage. Then, in December, she became Jeongbi (정비; 定妃).

At this time, Lady Ahn's father, Ahn Geuk-in (안극인) who was a comrade-in-chief, suggested that King Gongmin suspend the construction of Princess Noguk's Yeongjeon (영전; 影殿), but Ahn Geuk-in was removed from the office. After her re-entry to the Palace, the King continued to commit misdeeds, such as ordering her to have sex with some of the young men from Jajewi (자제위; 子弟衛), although she adamantly refused. In May 1367, she and Consort Han went to Gorari (고라리; 高羅里) and watched Gyeoggu Game (격구놀).

In October 1372 (21st year of King Gongmin), he ordered some young and handsome men from the Self-Defense Committee, Han Ahn (한안) and Hong Ryun (홍륜), to have sex with his concubines so that they would become pregnant and Gongmin could claim the son as his. Eventually, Lady Ahn, Royal Consort Ik-Bi and others couldn't refuse his order and actually became pregnant. In 1374, King Gongmin was assassinated and King U ascended the throne.

=== During King U's reign ===
Lady Ahn went out from the Palace and became a nun. Then, King U made her younger brother, Ahn Suk-ro (안숙로)'s daughter his consort with the title Hyeon-Bi (현비; 賢妃). Even after King Gongmin's death, the court under King U's command still respected all of the late King Gongmin's widowed consorts and continued to provide their daily necessities until it was stopped in 1388. The new King also gave "Jahye Mansion" (자혜부; 慈惠府) as Ahn's palace to live.

After King U's ascension to the throne, it was said that U always taunted and harassed the Dowager Consort Ahn by saying:

"Among my consorts, How can they have no one like you, Mother?"
"나의 후궁들은 어찌 모씨(母氏)와 같은 이가 없는가?"

He often visited her mansion two or three times a day, sometimes going there again at night. Because of this, there was a rumor that Ahn was harassed by King U for attempted rape and strange rumors circulated. One day, while King U went to her palace again, Lady Ahn fell ill and didn't comb her hair, so they cancelled their meeting and he instead met with her niece. Seeing this, people said:

"The Dowager Consort is trying to hide herself because she is in fear of ridicule from others."
"정비가 남의 비웃음을 두려워하여 스스로 감추려 하는 것이다."

Besides this, there was an interpretation that King U, who was an orphan with no one to depend on, craved maternal love from his stepmother, Consort Ahn.

=== During King Chang and King Gongyang's reign ===
In 1388, Yi Seong-gye (이성계) deposed King U from his position and as the oldest member in the palace, Ahn agreed to choose the new candidate to succeed him, King Chang.

One year later, Yi and Jeong Mong-ju (정몽주) deposed King Chang and forced her to crown King Gongyang as the new one. So she then dethroned King Chang and proclaimed a letter stating that King Gongyang was crowned. Under King Gongyang's command, Ahn then moved to "Gyeongsin Hall" (경신전; 敬愼殿) and was honoured as Royal Grand Consort Jeongsuk-seonmyeong-gyeongsin-ikseong-yuhye (정숙선명경신익성유혜왕대비; 貞淑宣明敬信翼成柔惠王大妃).

In 1392, Yi and his allies forced King Gongyang's dethronement and threatened Ahn by forcing her with a memorandum to allow the establishment of a new dynasty and handed over the national seal to him. As a result, the Goryeo period fell after almost 475 years and the new Joseon was established.

=== Later life, death and funeral ===
Lady Ahn lived a long life through the late Goryeo and early Joseon periods. Joseon was established by Yi Seong-gye. Later, on 7 August 1392 (4th year reign of King Taejo), she was honoured as Princess Uihwa (의화궁주; 義和宮主) which she was commonly known as during the Joseon dynasty. Later, on 14 May 1428 (1th year reign of King Sejong), she died, 36 years after Goryeo's abolishment.

In Joseon Sillok, it was recorded that Ahn was prone to drink alcohol after being christened as "Princess Uihwa" and she also spent most of her later life drinking after the fall of Goryeo dynasty. 6 days after her death, King Sejong prayed and took care of her funeral with the old system and used the Queen consort's rites manners (including dressing her like the real queen). But, her tomb's location is unknown as there were no records about it.

=== Ancestry ===
Ancestors of Jeongbi An

An Han-pyeong 안한평
An Sa-gyeong 안사경
An Geuk-in, Prince Jukseong 안극인 죽성군
Royal Consort Jeong-Bi An 정비 안씨
Yi Im-jong 이임종
Lady, of the Gari Yi clan 부인 가리 이씨

== Family ==
- Father - Ahn Geuk-in, Prince Jukseong (안극인 죽성군; 安克人 竹城君; 1296–1383)
- Mother - Lady Yi of the Gari Yi clan (가리 이씨; 嘉利 李氏; 1296–?)
- Siblings
  - Older brother - Ahn Cheon-ro (안천로; 安天老; 1344–?)
  - Older brother - Ahn Jung-ro (안중로; 安仲老; 1350–?)
  - Younger brother - Ahn Suk-ro (안숙로; 安叔老; 1353–1394)
- Spouse - Wang Jeon, King Gongmin of Goryeo (공민왕; 23 May 1330 – 27 October 1374)
  - Father-in-law - Wang Man, King Chungsuk of Goryeo (충숙왕; 30 July 1294 – 3 May 1339)
  - Mother-in-law - Queen Gongwon of the Namyang Hong clan (공원왕후 홍씨; 25 August 1298 – 12 February 1380)
- Issue
  - Adoptive son - Wang Woo, King U of Goryeo (고려 우왕; 25 July 1365 – 31 December 1389)
    - Adoptive daughter-in-law - Royal Consort Geun-bi of the Goseong Yi clan (근비 이씨)
      - Adoptive grandson - Wang Chang, King Chang of Goryeo (창왕; 6 September 1380 – 31 December 1389)

== In popular culture ==
- Portrayed by Chaeryung in the 1983 KBS TV series Foundation of the Kingdom.
- Portrayed by Han Young-sook in the 1983 MBC TV series 500 Years of Joseon: The King of Chudong Palace.
- Portrayed by Han Eun-jin in the 1996–1998 KBS1 TV series Tears of the Dragon.
- Portrayed by Seo Ji-seung in the 2005 MBC TV series Shin Don.
- Portrayed by Kim Min-joo in the 2014 KBS1 TV series Jeong Do-jeon.
- Portrayed by Kim Ji-hyun in the 2015–2016 SBS TV series Six Flying Dragons.
- Portrayed by Kim Bo-mi in the 2021–2022 KBS1 TV series The King of Tears, Lee Bang-won.
