= Danyang Woo clan =

Korean clan from North Chungcheong Province

- Country: North and South Korea
- Current region: Danyang County
- Founder: U Hyŏn

The Danyang Woo clan (Korean: 단양 우씨; Hanja: 丹陽 禹氏) is a Korean clan. Their Bon-gwan is in Danyang County, North Chungcheong Province. According to the 2015 census, the number of members was 191,287. Their founder is U Hyŏn who was said to be a descendant of mythical Yu the Great, however, due to a lack of ancestry literature, it is impossible to research if this is true.

== Origin ==
The founder U Hyŏn (우현, 禹玄; 918–1035) served as Jeongjohojang (정조호장, 魣朝戶長) during the reign of King Gwangjong of Goryeo. U Hyŏn later married the youngest daughter of Shin Sung-gyeom (the founder of the Pyeongsan Shin clan), and had a son, Woo Shin (우신, 禹臣; 939–1066).

When Woo Jung-dae (우중대, 禹仲大; 1212-?), U Hyŏn's 6th generation descendant, reached and held the position of Munha sijung (門下侍中, 문하시중), and he officially began the Danyang Woo clan.

His eldest son, Woo Cheon-gyu (우천규, 禹天珪; 1237-?), was the Namseongjeonseo (남성전서, 南省典書), and his eldest daughter was Queen Jeongan (정안왕후 우씨; 1238-?).

His second son, Woo Cheon-gye (우천계, 禹天啓; 1239-?) was the Panseo (판서, 判書), and the third son, Woo Cheon-seok (우천석, 禹天錫; 1241-?), was also promoted to the rank of Munha sijung.

Woo Cheon-gyu's son, Woo Tak (1262–1342), died with the rank of Seonggyunjwaeju (성균좨주, 成均祭酒). Woo Cheon-seok's great-grandson, Woo Hyeon-bo (우현보, 禹玄寶; 1333–1400), was given the title Internal Princess Danyang (단양부원군, 丹陽府院君). His daughter was Royal Consort Hyegyeong (혜경빈 우씨; 1359-?).

Woo Hyeon-bo's eldest grandson, Woo Seong-beom (우성범, 禹成範; 1374-?), became King Gongyang's sire. Woo In-yeol (우인열, 禹仁烈; 1337–1403), a 10th generation descendant, was awarded the title of Contributor to the Founding Fathers of the Joseon Dynasty and reached the rank of Pansam Sasa (판삼사사, 判三司事).

The Danyang Woo clan produced 35 people who passed the civil service exam during the Joseon Dynasty.

== Notable people ==
- Zico (rapper)
- Woo Do-hwan
- Woo Mi-hwa
- U Tak
- Woo Jang-choon
- Woo Won-shik

== See also ==
- Korean clan names of foreign origin
