= U T'ak =

Korean Confucian scholar (1262–1342)

- Hangul: 우탁
- Hanja: 禹倬
- RR: U Tak
- MR: U T'ak

Art name
- Hangul: 백운, 단암
- Hanja: 白雲, 丹巖
- RR: Baekun, Danam
- MR: Paegun, Tanam

Courtesy name
- Hangul: 천장, 탁보
- Hanja: 天章, 卓甫
- RR: Cheonjang, Takbo
- MR: Ch'ŏnjang, T'akpo

Posthumous name
- Hangul: 문희
- Hanja: 文僖
- RR: Munhui
- MR: Munhŭi

U T'ak (Korean: 우탁; Hanja: 禹倬; 1262–1342), also known as Woo Tak, was a Korean Neo-Confucian scholar and philosopher during Korea’s Goryeo dynasty. He was also commonly known as Yŏktong Sŏnsaeng (역동선생; 易東先生). His art names were Paegun and Tanam, his courtesy names were Ch'ŏnjang and T'akpo, and his posthumous name was Munhŭi. U T'ak helped spread Neo-Confucianism, which had come from the Yuan dynasty, in Korea. He was a disciple of the Neo-Confucian scholar, An Hyang.

U T'ak belonged to the Danyang U clan. He was the 7th generation descendant of the Danyang U clan's founding ancestor, U Hyŏn. U had two sons, U Wŏn-gwang (우원광; 禹元光) and U Wŏn-myŏng (우원명; 禹元明). U T'ak is considered as the ancestor of the Moonheegong branch (문희공파; 文僖公派) of the Danyang U clan. By 1308, U held the Censorate office of royal inspector (감찰규정; 監察糾正; kamch'algyujŏng), however he protested newly reigning King Chungseon's relationship with late king's former concubine, Lady Sukchang by bringing an axe to court and appealed to the king to reconsider his ways. U would retire early from the court after this incident.

U T'ak was a respected scholar and centuries after his death, a Joseon Confucian scholar, Yi Hwang, helped to establish the Yeokdong Seowon in honor of U T'ak in 1570.

== See also ==
- An Hyang
- Danyang Woo clan
