= An Pangjun =

Korean general (1573–1654)

- Hangul: 안방준
- Hanja: 安邦俊
- RR: An Bangjun
- MR: An Pangjun

Art name
- Hangul: 은봉, 우산, 빙호자
- Hanja: 隱峰, 牛山, 氷壺子
- RR: Eunbong, Usan, Binghoja
- MR: Ŭnbong, Usan, Pinghoja

Courtesy name
- Hangul: 사언
- Hanja: 士彦
- RR: Saeon
- MR: Saŏn

Posthumous name
- Hangul: 문강
- Hanja: 文康
- RR: Mungang
- MR: Mun'gang

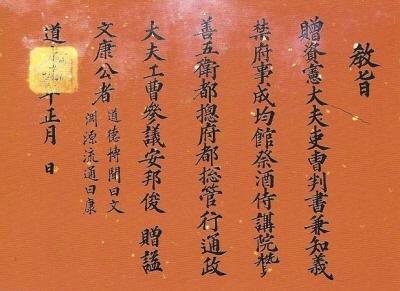
Order of An Pangjun's Posthumous name denominates

An Pangjun (Korean: 안방준; Hanja: 安邦俊; July 20, 1573 – November 13, 1654) was one of the Neo-Confucian scholars, politicians and writers of the Korean Joseon Dynasty and he was a Righteous army leader during the Imjin War.

His art names were Ŭnbong, Usan and Pinghoja, his courtesy name was Saŏn, and his posthumous name was Mungang.

== Biography ==
He was born and died in Boseong, South Jeolla Province.

== Works ==
Works are:

- Ŭnbong chŏnsŏ (은봉전서; 隱峰全書)
- Samwŏngisa (삼원기사; 三寃記事)
- Kimyoyujŏknoralsusa (기묘유적노랄수사; 己卯遺蹟老辣瀡辭):Recordings related to the Gimyo Sahwa
- Saugamgyerok (사우감계록; 師友鑑戒錄)
- Honjŏngrok (혼정록; 混定錄)
- Honjŏngpyŏnnok (혼정편록; 混定編錄)
- Maehwanmundap (매환문답; 買還問答)
- Hanguisinpyŏn (항의신편; 抗義新編)
- Idaewŏnjŏn (이대원전; 李大源傳)
- Honam ŭibyŏng nok (호남의병록; 湖南義兵錄)
- Pusan kisa (부산기사; 釜山記事)
- Noryang kisa (노량기사; 露粱記事)
