= Han Kyeong-hwa =

South Korean voice actor (born 1977)

- Born: 1977 (age 48–49)
- Occupation: Voice actor
- Employer: Munhwa Broadcasting Corporation

Korean name
- Hangul: 한경화
- RR: Han Gyeonghwa
- MR: Han Kyŏnghwa

Han Kyeong-hwa (Korean: 한경화; born 1977) is a South Korean voice actress. She joined the Munhwa Broadcasting Corporation's voice acting division in 2004.

== Roles ==
=== Broadcast television ===
- Story Tour (MBC)
- 24 (Korea TV Edition, MBC)
- Smallville (Korea TV Edition, MBC)
- CSI: Crime Scene Investigation (Korea TV Edition, MBC)
- CSI: Miami (Korea TV Edition, MBC)

== See also ==
- Munhwa Broadcasting Corporation
- MBC Voice Acting Division
