= Kyunghwa Lee =

Visual art and new media artist, architect and director

KyungHwa Lee
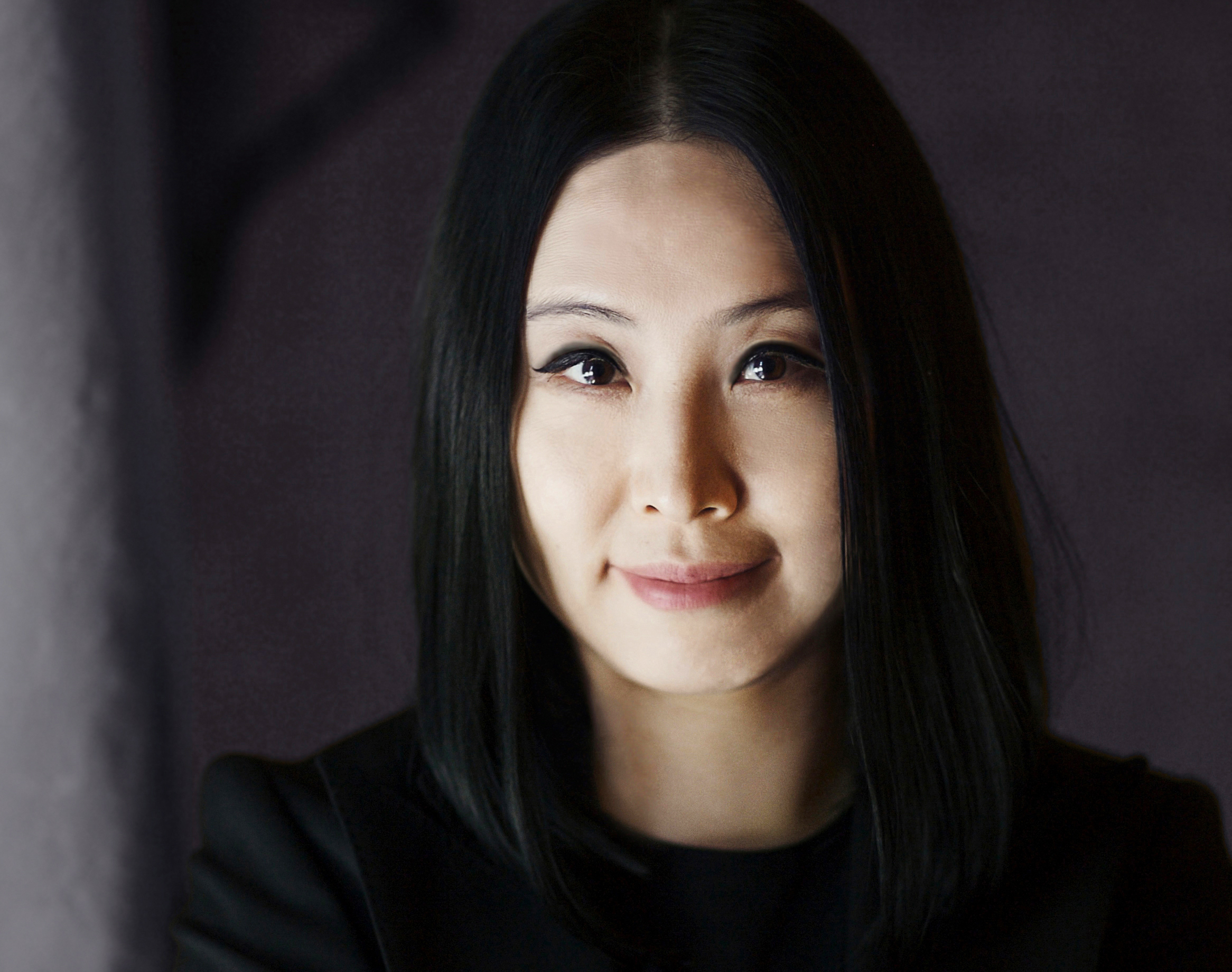
- Born: Seoul, South Korea
- Known for: performance art, installation art, new media art
- Notable work: Plasticity : Architectural Bodies, Malleable Bodies, Body Metamorphing

KyungHwa Lee (Korean: 이경화) is a visual art and new media artist, architect, director, and writer exploring the experimental nature of contemporary art from the perspectives of architecture, fashion, and philosophy.

She serves as the International Director of the Nam June Paik Cultural Foundation and a columnist for The Korea Times and was formerly the International Director at the Korean Society of Art Theory.

== Early life and career ==
Lee was born in Seoul, South Korea. She lived in Seoul and Japan during her early life. Influenced by eastern Asian traditional cultures, she began to incorporate a deep interest in combining food, clothing and shelter, which are basic necessities of life, to the arts. She became interested in the philosophical origin of visual representation and began to study architecture. She received her Master of Architecture degree from the Harvard University Graduate School of Design. Her work reflects the harmonization of philosophy, fashion, and architecture. Her installation and performance art has been shown at galleries and museums worldwide. Currently, she resides in Los Angeles, California in the United States. She also provides art, design, and architecture consultation to major companies and to the cities of Seoul and Busan.

== Works ==
Lee's experimentations to reveal the interstice of art and philosophy have gained attention since the opening ceremony of "The Zizek/Badiou Event of Philosophy 2013 (Alain Badiou and Slavoj Žižek in South Korea)" held in the Seoul Platoon Kunsthalle in South Korea. Her work has been widely noted for reflecting the current historical moment of contemporary art by combining various genres, including architecture, technology, virtual reality, fashion, and phenomenology.

=== Malleable Bodies: Flusser, Foucault, Plasticity, and the Corset ===
"Malleable Bodies: Flusser, Foucault, Plasticity, and the Corset", exhibited at the REDCAT (the Roy and Edna Disney CalArts Theater, Walt Disney Concert Hall (Los Angeles 2018) and the National Museum of Modern and Contemporary Art (Seoul, South Korea) in Seoul in 2015, is a work of installation performance art exploring the nature and structure of the human body as architectural space within the context of technological, aesthetic, and theoretical approaches. The audience experiences the creation of the ideal body by walking through a huge "black box" space, installed as an interlocking transitional space, in a 3D printed corset temporarily attached to each individual's body. A subsequent performance by six performers, representing actualization of the ideal body, while simultaneous projection on canvas captures the historical progression of representation, conveys a "new space" combining the real world and the virtual world. The space where the real world and virtual world co-exist and where the unseen reality becomes presented reality is demonstrated. The audience becomes part of the performance art and also function as the subjects driving the intention of the artist. At the end of the performance, the audible, disembodied questions "Who are you?" and "Where are you?" are projected. These common questions resonate freshly in this moment. The performance leads the audience to contemplate identity contextualized by the body as architectural and malleable.

The installation proposes the human body as a vessel subject to design and reconfiguration. The performers embody the dimensionality of conceptualized reality. However, the imaged body is re-created through the processes of digital information and 3D printing. This coalescence of actualized and imagined reality is made manifest in contemporary experience.

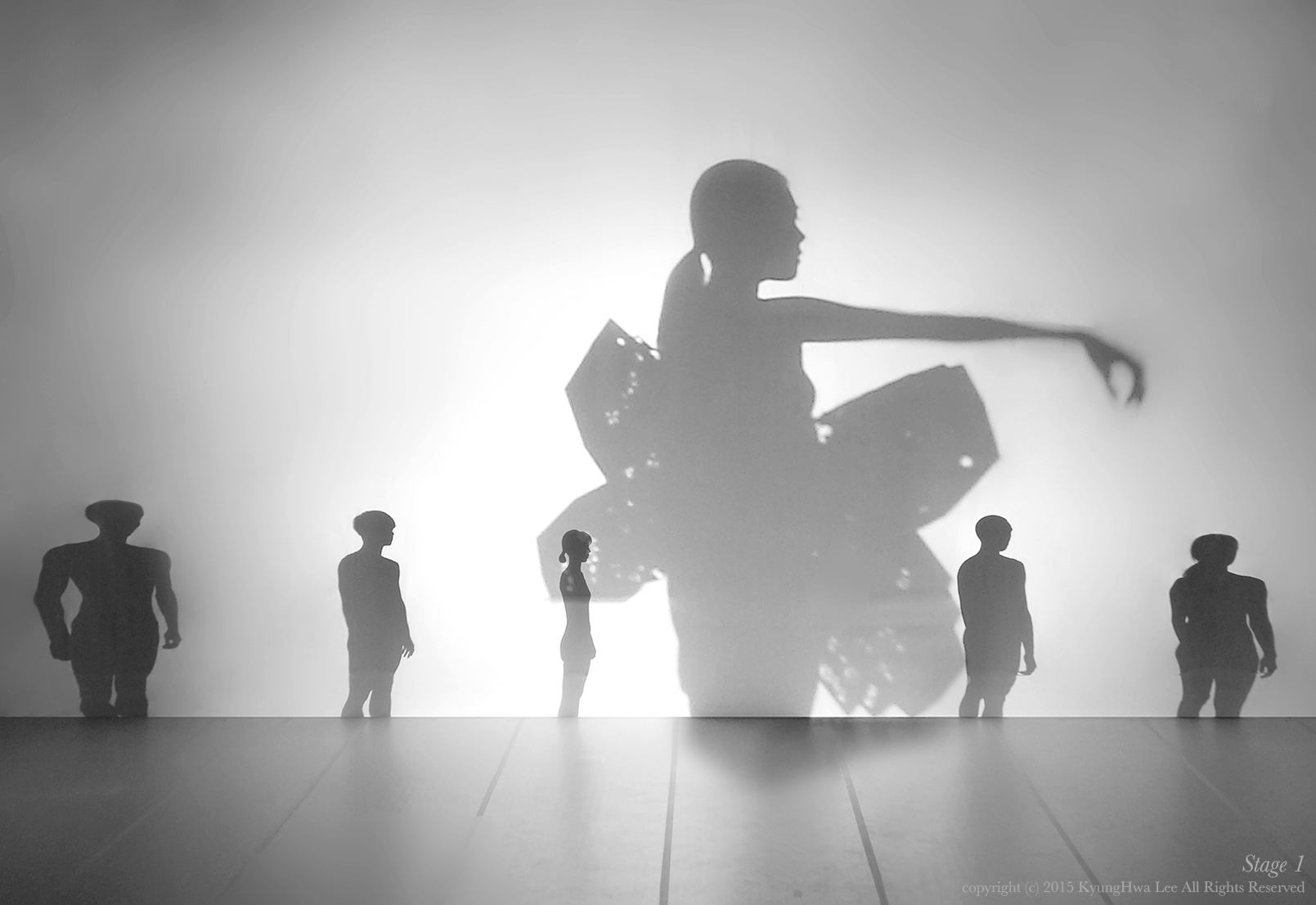
Monochromatic Flat Shadow of the Corset Body as Idealized Reality

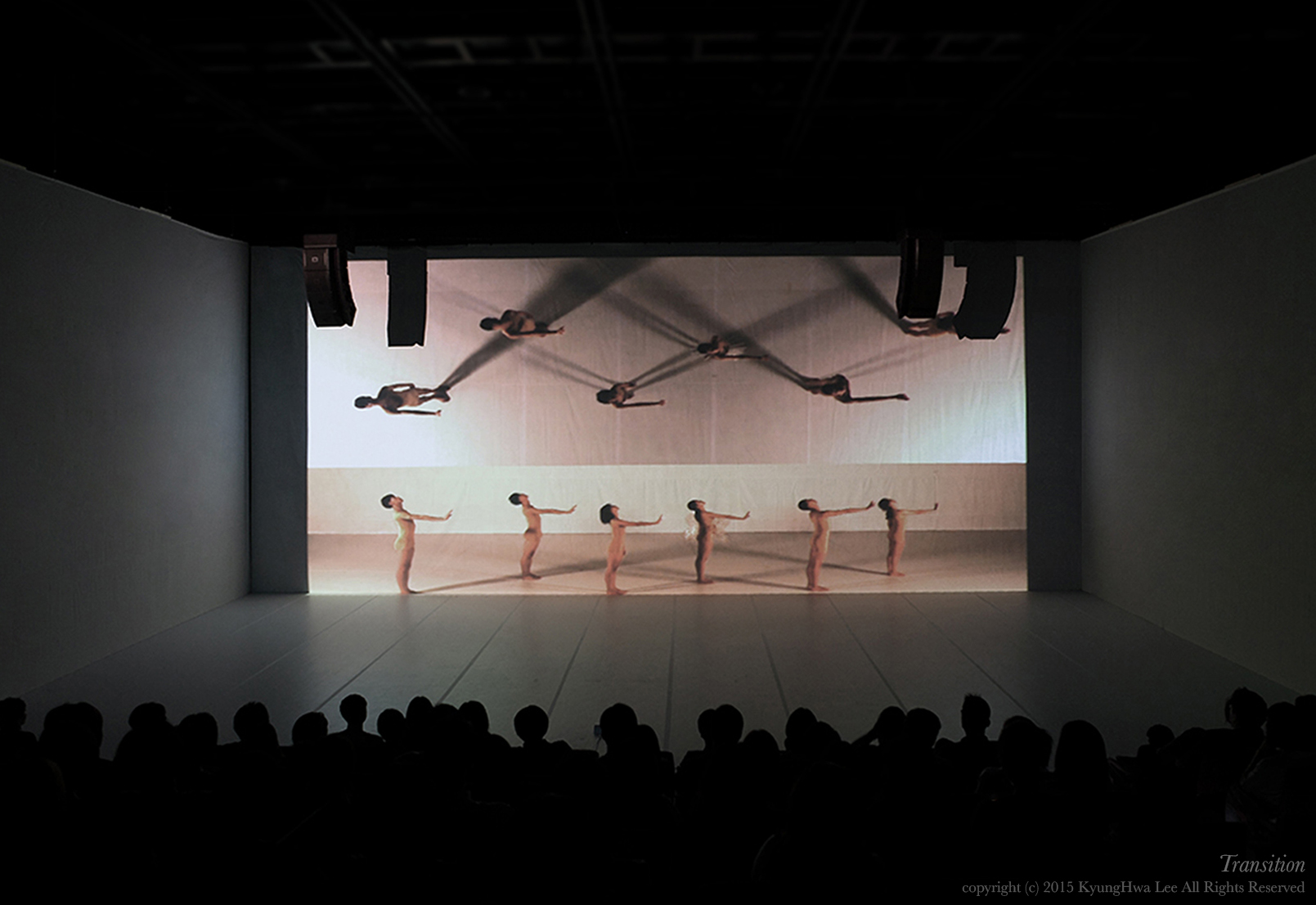
Two-Dimensionality of the Photographic Projection of the Body

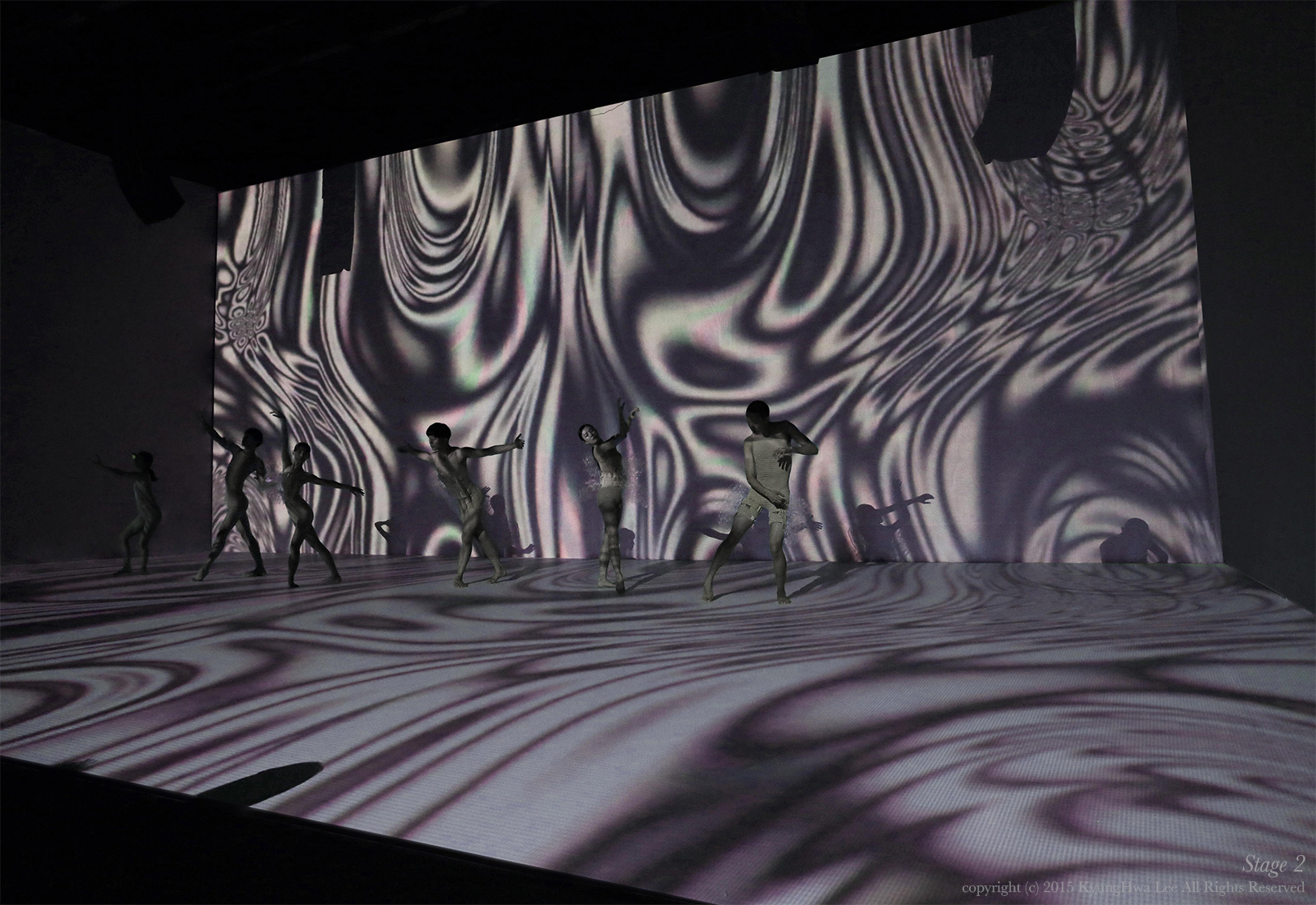
Three-DimensionalIty of the Appearance of the Disciplined Body

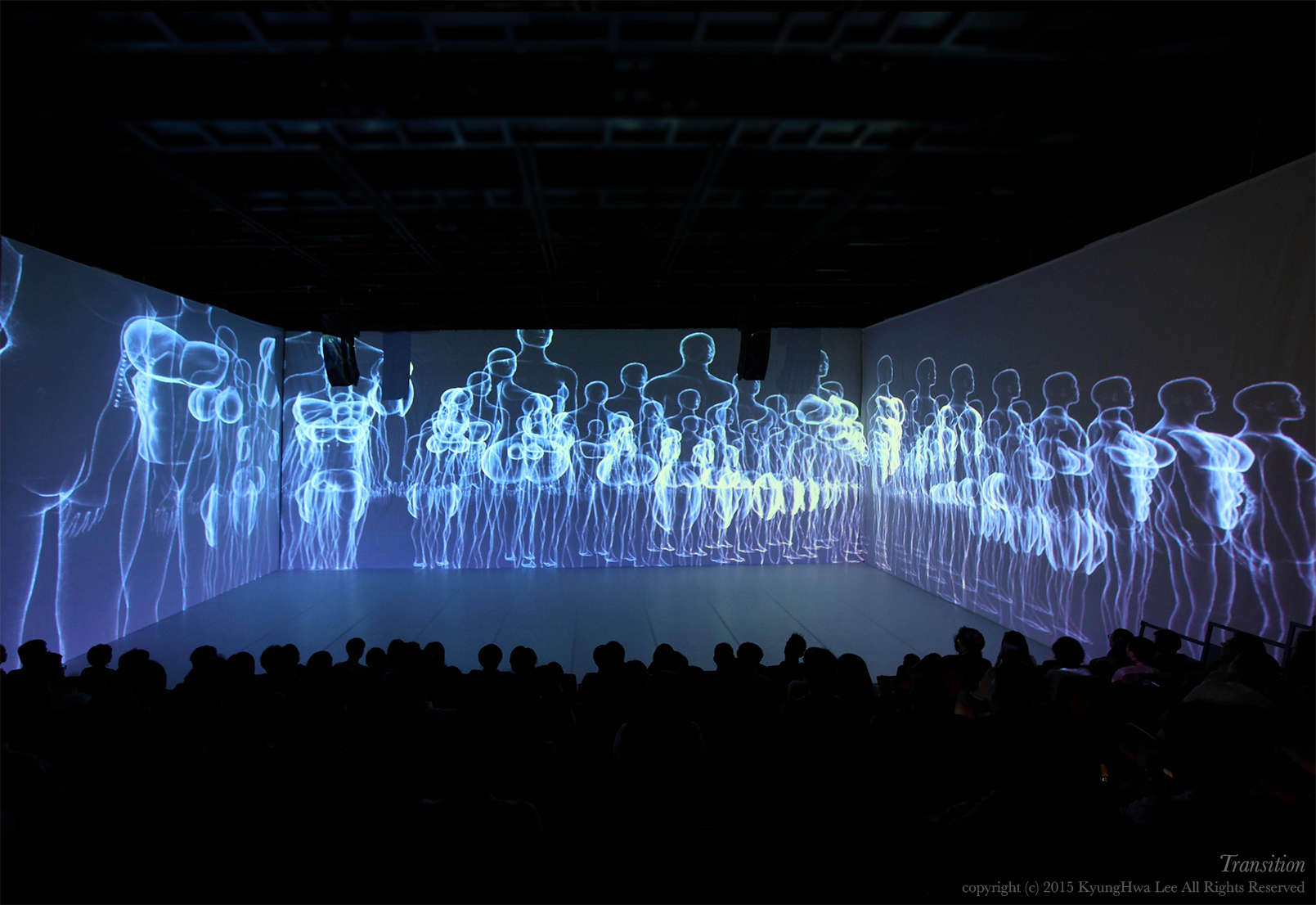
Four-Dimensionality of the Transformation of the Digital Body

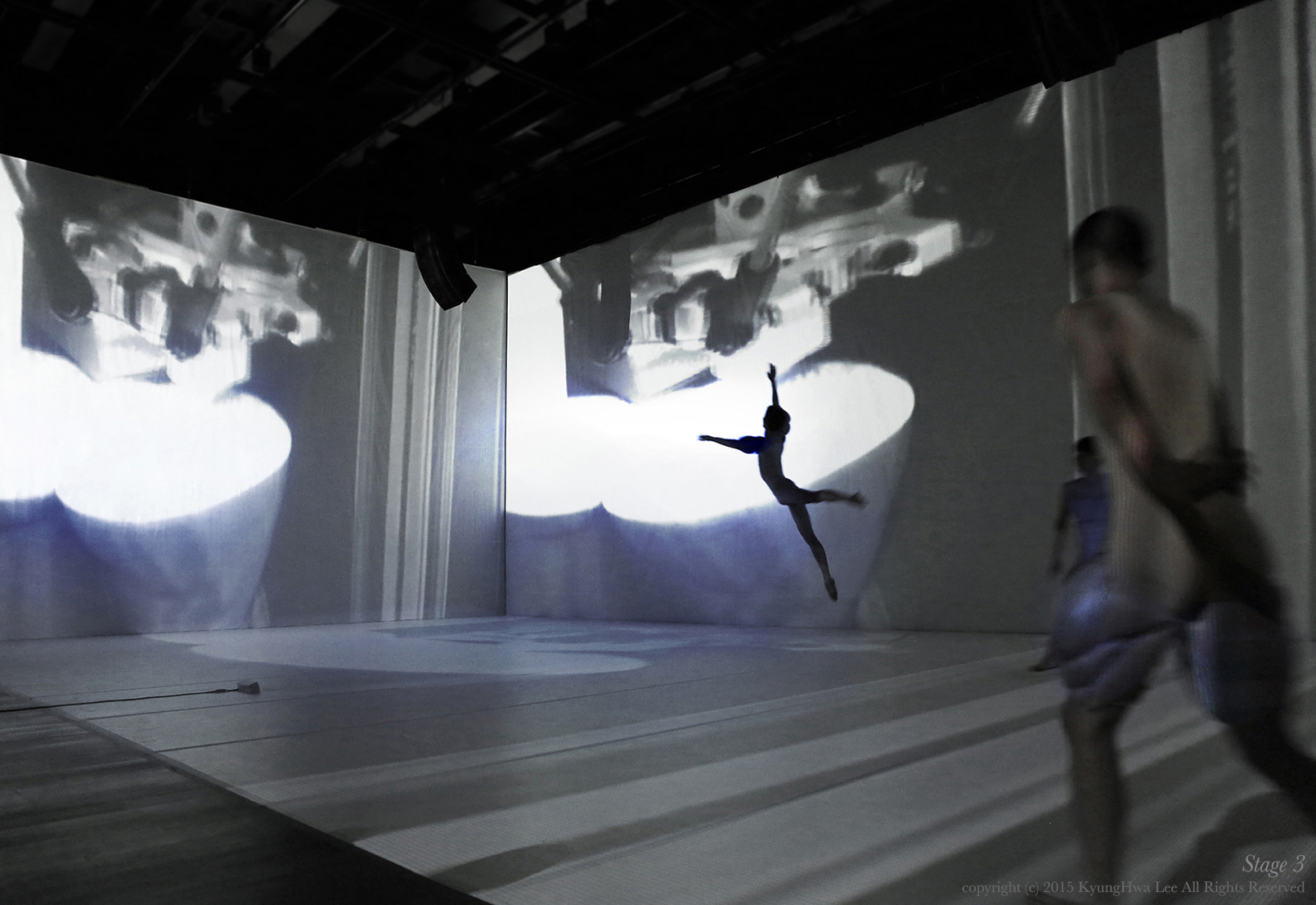
Conflation of Spatiality by Ex Nihilo Production and Corsetization of the Body Through 3D Printing

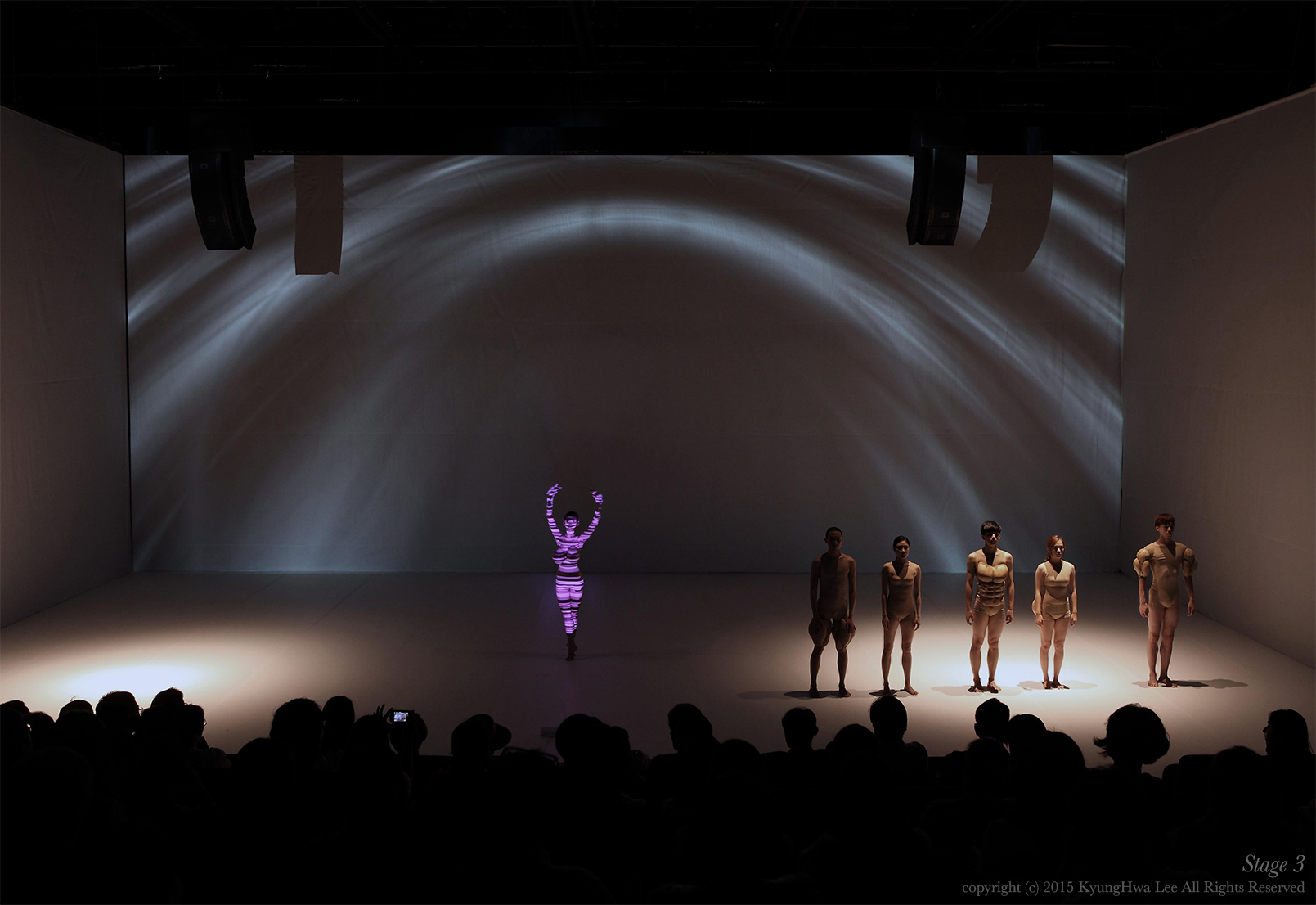
Conflation of Spatiality by Ex Nihilo Production and Corsetization of the Body Through 3D Printing

#1	Stage1	Monochromatic Flat Shadow of the Corset Body as Idealized Reality
#2	Transition	Two-Dimensionality of the Photographic Projection of the Body
#3	Stage2	Three-DimensionalIty of the Appearance of the Disciplined Body
#4	Transition	Four-Dimensionality of the Transformation of the Digital Body
#5	Stage3	Conflation of Spatiality by Ex Nihilo Production and Corsetization of the Body Through 3D Printing
#6	Epilogue	Philosopher Video Interview

=== The Zizek/Badiou Event of Philosophy 2013, Seoul, South Korea ===
==== Transition In-Between: Performance Art: Opening Ceremony for the Event ====
This opening ceremony underscored themes of freedom, social deconstruction, and challenging taboos, which featured prominently in the subsequent talks given by Slavoj Zizek and Alain Badiou.

The traditional Korean wedding ceremony signifies the union of the yin and the yang. The earth is thought of as yin and the sky as yang. Sunset occurs at the point where the sky and the earth meet. For that reason, Korean wedding ceremonies traditionally occur during the sunset hour. This art performance was inspired by the desire to question current wedding culture, which has been highly distorted as Korean culture adopts Western traditions without question.

This work, which is a reenactment of the artist's own wedding ceremony, incorporates the symbolic color red, and interprets the traditional meanings of the wedding ceremony in a contemporary context. The performer playing the bride makes her appearance in a high-ceilinged gallery, which signifies the traditional authority of churches, wearing an exaggerated red 50-meter long bridal veil. The bride and groom enter the space simultaneously and equally, and follow a line of candles prepared with the help of the audience to a small central stage. Here, the ceremony is performed, integrating Western visual elements of fashion and architecture (seen) and Eastern actions of symbolic meaning (unseen). After the ceremony, the removal of the bride's veil symbolizes the discarding of restrictions and challenges society's taboos about weddings and marriage. The performers leave behind the existing strictures and seek a new liberated future outside the gallery space.

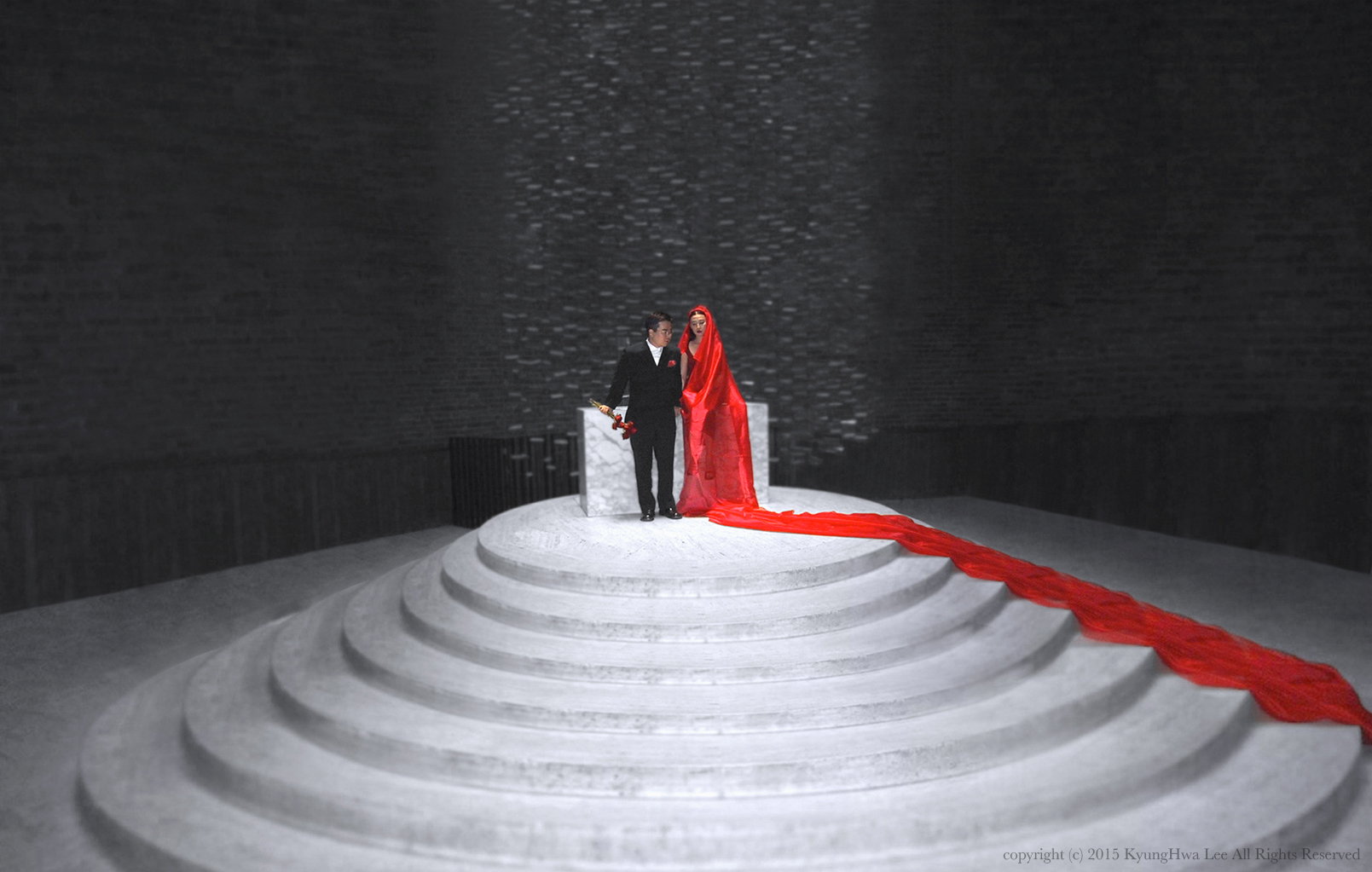
Transition In-Between: Performance Art: Opening Ceremony for the Event

==== Flexile Panoptiosis: Mirror Room: Installation Art ====
Designed specifically for the Zizek/Badiou Event of Philosophy 2013, the Flexile Panoptiosis occupied the smallest unit of the Kunsthalle gallery. This work challenged ideas of spatial and cultural authority.

A "Hall of Mirrors" was originally built at Versailles by Louis XIV of France, le Roi-Soleil, in order to showcase the authority of France. This artwork features a new hall of mirrors, conveying the concept of decentralized authority. In a small room in the Kunsthalle, mirrors are placed on the left and right walls and on the floor and ceiling, while the front wall comprises a street-facing window covered with an image of the head of Queen Elizabeth I. At the base of the Queen's portrait, a large, red ruff collar sits at the level of her neck. This room of mirrors expresses the organic change inherent to ocularcentrism by using mirrors to explore the interrelationship of the viewer and the viewed.

As soon as the viewers, who have been provided with ruffed collars, enter the room, they are dominated by the appearance of an endless array of ruff collars and view themselves through endless reflected images. The small room is transformed into an infinite world, while a viewer from outside the room will see a distorted shadow through the window. The opulent interior of the mirror room is simply perceived as flat shadows and reflections from the outside.

In this space, viewers discover that they are slaves to subconscious desires that are not filtered through their perceptions. Rather than responding to the image of the Queen and the endless repetition of images with the awe and deference typical of art galleries, viewers interact organically with the mirror room, lying on the floor, making funny faces, and laughing at the results. While the artwork intrinsically projects power, viewers are able to free themselves from the authority of images.

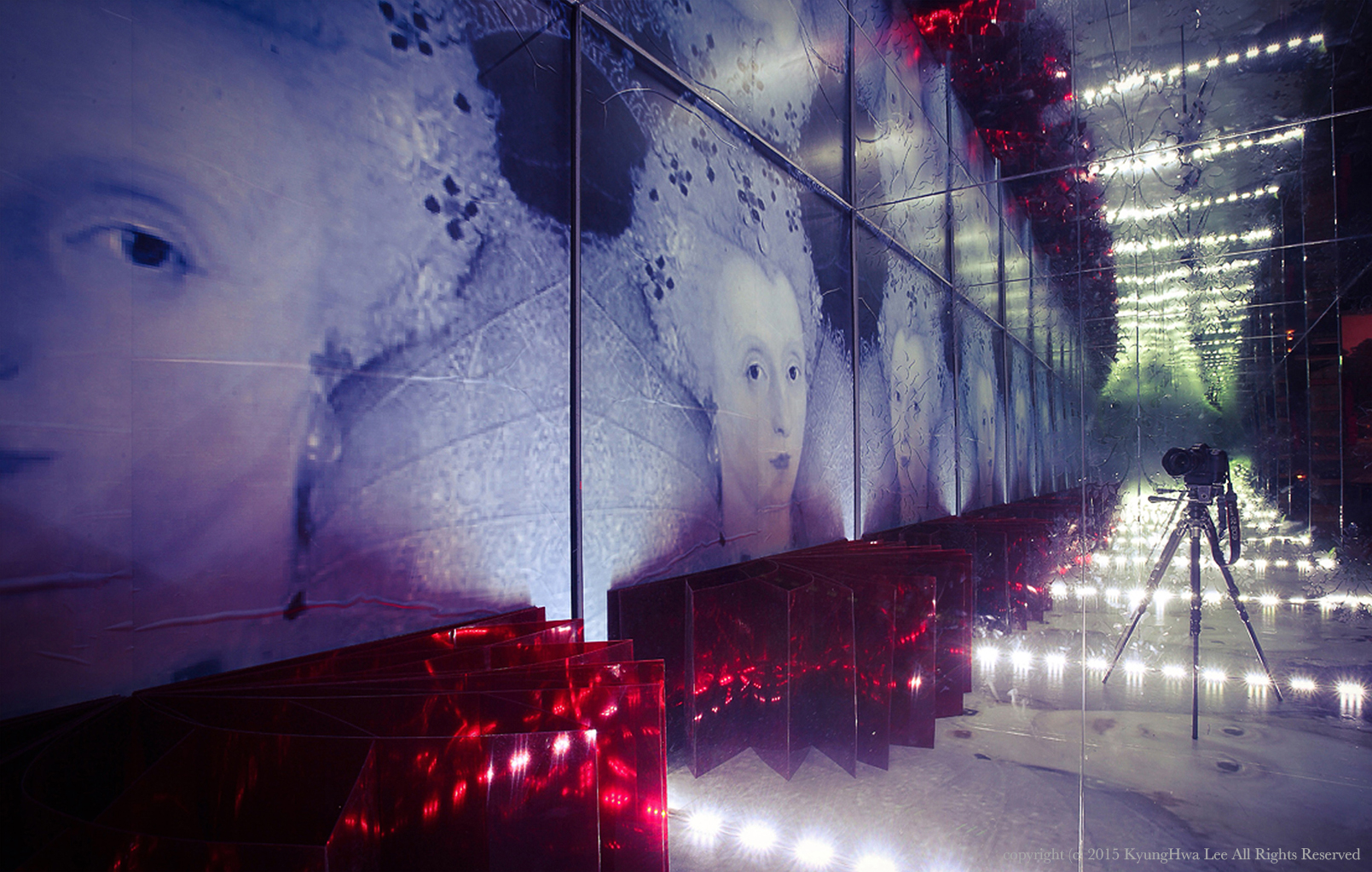
Flexile Panoptiosis: Mirror box: Installation Art

==== Urban Facade: Integration of Fashion and Architecture: Projection Mapping ====
Two recordings of "flexile panoptiosis" are projected onto the façade of the Kunsthalle. The first recording shows the shadows of performers through a lace curtain. The second recording provides an overhead view of the same performance, which appears horizontally and parallel to the first recording. The performance, which takes place in the interior of the building, starts with the appearance of a queen, who is wearing items of fashion that visually symbolize her authority, including a ruffed collar and an elaborate gown, moving across the stage trailed by a procession of followers. All the performers wear the architectural elements of form, structure, material, plan and section as fashion items. At the beginning of the performance, the performers' fashionable accoutrements visually project power to the audience. As the performance proceeds, the performers progressively deconstruct the elements of power. At the end of the performance, the audience is invited to interact with these elements of power, inhabiting the same stage space as the performers, wearing and playing with these fashionable items as toys while appearing as shadows behind the curtain.

Human experience begins with the relationship between the act of viewing and the viewed object. When one views an object, he or she perceives it and forms a relationship with it. The act of viewing comprises an important aspect of this artwork. The theme of ocular centrism explores the relationship of subject and object, mediated by sight, which acts as a medium of power and restriction. By spatially aligning this concept with the format of the Panopticon, Lee's artwork symbolically illustrates the desire and awe that we experience for objects we see.

A good example of the relationship and restrictions in the area of fashion is the ruff collar and cuffs that were popular amongst the nobles and royalty of 16th and 17th century Europe to project their status and power. In architecture, a good example is the Panopticon, created by Jeremy Bentham in the 18th century to efficiently control people through the usage of space, and which visually looks strikingly like a ruff. By interconnecting the ruff and the Panopticon from a philosophical perspective, Lee has integrated fashion and architecture in order to explore the interrelation between the viewer and the viewed.

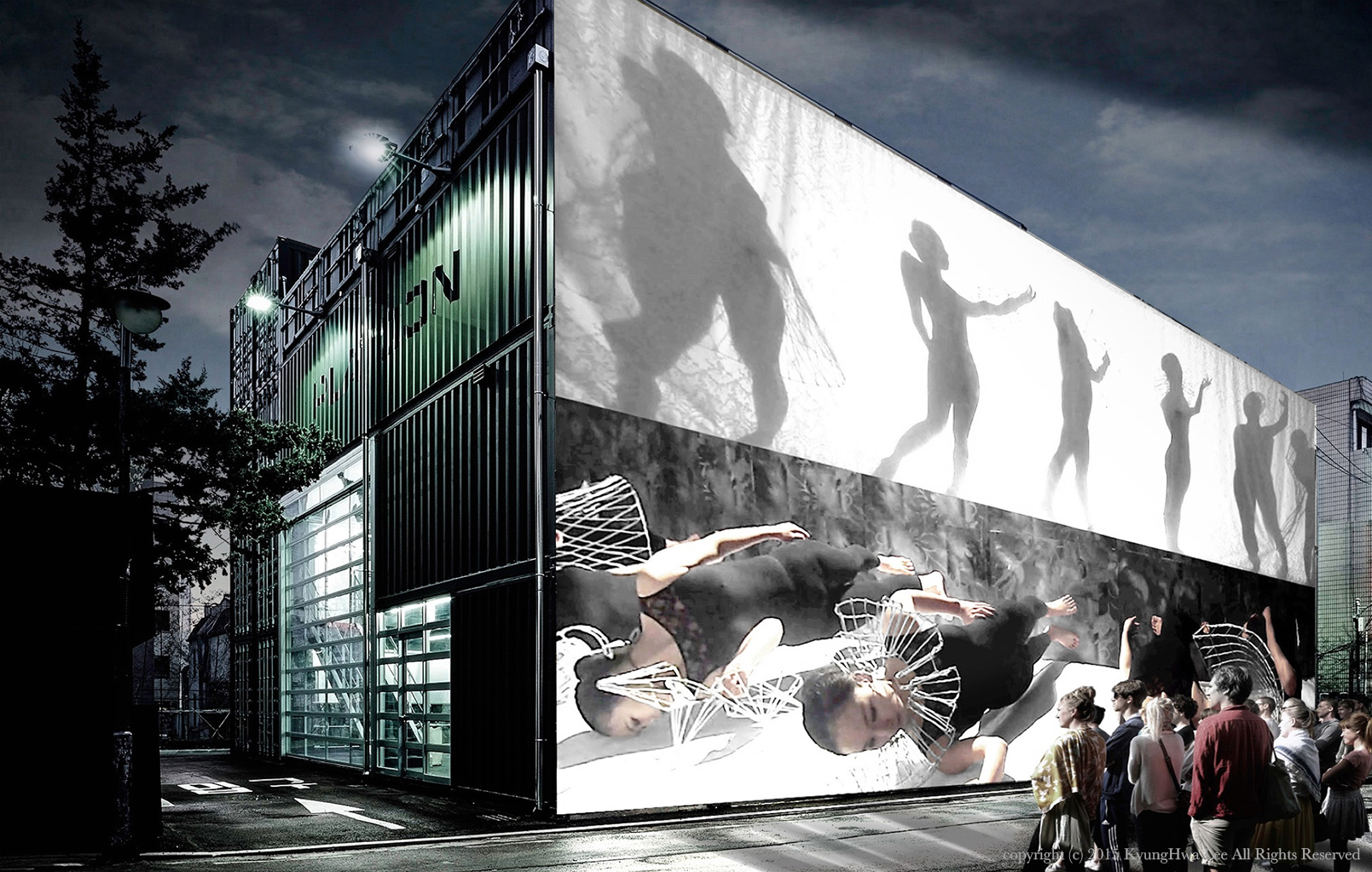
Urban Facade: Integration of Fashion and Architecture: Projection Mapping

== Works and exhibitions ==
- 2018 Malleable Bodies: Flusser, Plasticity, and the Corset, REDCAT, Los Angeles
- 2018 Preserving Virtuality in Continuity | From New Media to the Posthuman in Art
- 2017 Panelist of Art Basel Hong Kong 2017 | Technologies of the Present | New Media at Work
- 2017 Plasticity: Architectural Bodies - Telepresence Philosopher's Talk Performance, Los Angeles
- 2017 Guest Lecturer on The Philosophy Of Disembodiment: The Aesthetics of Post-Humanism, UCLA Philosophy Department, Los Angeles
- 2015 Malleable Bodies: Flusser, Foucault, Plasticity, and the Corset, MMCA
- 2014 Body Metamorphing, Gana Art Center
- 2013 금기
- 2013 The Zizek/Badiou Event of Philosophy 2013, Platoon Kunsthalle, Seoul, South Korea
  - Flexile Panoptiosis
  - Transition in Between
  - Urban Facade
- 2012 Flexile Panoptiosis
