= Gongyang of Goryeo =

King of Goryeo from 1389 to 1392

Gongyang

King of Goryeo
- Reign: 1389–1392
- Coronation: 1389
- Predecessor: Chang of Goryeo
- Successor: Dynasty abolished (Taejo of Joseon as the first King of Joseon)
- Born: Wang Yo; 9 March 1345; Goryeo
- Died: 17 May 1394 (aged 49); Samcheok-hyeon, Gangwon Province, Joseon
- Burial: Goryeo: Goreung tomb San 65–6, Wondang-dong, Deokyang-gu, Goyang, South Korea; Joseon: Gongyang Royal Tomb; 178, Gungchon-ri, Geundeok-myeon, Samcheok, Gangwon Province, South Korea
- Spouse: Royal Consort Sun (before 1389)
- Issue: Prince Jeongseong; Princess Suknyeong; Princess Jeongsin; Princess Gyeonghwa
Regnal name
- Before ascended the throne: Prince Jeongchang (정창군; 定昌君); Internal Prince Jeongchang (정창부원군; 定昌府院君); After dethroned and ended of the Goryeo period: Prince Gongyang (공양군; 恭讓君); In the exile place: King Ganseong (간성왕; 杆城王); After Yi Bang-won ascended the throne: King Gongyang (공양왕; 恭讓王)
Posthumous name
- King Gongyang The Great 공양대왕 恭讓大王
- House: Wang
- Father: Wang Kyun, Internal Prince Jeongwon
- Mother: Grand Consort Wang of Samhan State
- Religion: Buddhism

Korean name
- Hangul: 왕요
- Hanja: 王瑤
- RR: Wang Yo
- MR: Wang Yo

Monarch name
- Hangul: 공양왕
- Hanja: 恭讓王
- RR: Gongyangwang
- MR: Kongyangwang

Gongyang (9 March 1345 – 17 May 1394), (Note: In the Korean calendar (lunisolar), he was born on 5th day of the 2nd month of 1345 and died on 17th day of the 4th month of 1394.) personal name Wang Yo, was the 34th and final ruler of the Goryeo Dynasty of Korea. He was the descendant of Duke Yangyang, brother of King Huijong. He was deposed by Yi Sŏnggye, who then established the new Joseon.

== Biography ==
=== Background and early life ===
He was born as the second and youngest son of Wang Kyun, 6th-generation descendant of King Sinjong from his youngest son, Duke Yangyang. His mother was Princess Boknyeong, a great-granddaughter of King Chungnyeol. He had an older brother, Wang U, Prince Jeongyang. Due to this, the future King had the Goryeo royal family's bloods from both of paternal and maternal line.

At a young age, he was honoured as Prince Jeongchang (정창군; 定昌君) and then married the daughter of No Ch'aek, Internal Prince Changseong from the Gyoha No clan. His niece, Lady Kang, married Yi Sŏnggye as his second wife.

=== Reign ===
Although he did everything to prove that he had no political ambitions, Yi Sŏnggye's faction used him as a bloodless propaganda tool. In 1389, Yi's supporters forced King Chang from the throne and enthroned King Gongyang in his stead. This faction went on to oversee the events of King Gongyang's brief reign, including the assassinations of King U and King Chang. After the murder of Chŏng Mong-ju, the last major supporter of the Goryeo kings, King Gongyang was deposed in 1392 by Yi Sŏnggye, his son (Yi Pangwŏn), Chŏng Tojŏn and others, which brought the Goryeo dynasty to an end.

=== Life after deposition ===
The former king was initially exiled to Wonju and granted the title of Prince Gongyang (공양군; 恭讓君), but was later moved to Samcheok, where he was assassinated via strangulation in 1394 alongside his son, Crown Prince Wang Sŏk in Gungchon. In 1416, King Taejong honored him as King Gongyang (공양왕; 恭讓王) and sent an envoy to inspect his tomb.

== Family ==
- Father: Wang Kyun, Internal Prince Jeongwon (정원부원군 왕균)
  - Grandfather: Wang Yu, Marquess Sunhwa (순화후 왕유)
  - Grandmother: Consort Myeongye of the Mahan State of the Sin clan (마한국명예비 신씨)
- Mother: Grand Consort of Samhan State of the Wang clan (삼한국대비 왕씨)
  - Grandfather: Wang Hun, Grand Prince Yeondeok (연덕부원대군 왕훈)
  - Grandmother: Consort Anui of the Cho clan (안의비 조씨)

Consorts and their Respective Issue(s):

1. Royal Consort Sun of the Gyoha No clan
  1. Crown Prince Wang Sŏk, 1st son
  2. Princess Suknyeong, 1st daughter
  3. Princess Jeongsin, 2nd daughter
  4. Princess Gyeonghwa, 3rd daughter
2. Unknown
  1. 2nd son

=== Ancestry ===
Ancestors of Gongyang of Goryeo

Wang Pun, Marquess Ikyang 익양후 왕분
Wang Yu, Marquess Sunhwa 순화후 왕유
Lady, of the Miryang Pak clan 부인 밀양박씨
Wang Kyun, Internal Prince Jeongwon 정원부원군 왕균
Lady, of the Icheon Sin clan 부인 이천신씨
Wang Yo, King Gongyang 공양왕 왕요
Wang Cha, Duke Gangyang 강양공 왕자
Wang Hun, Grand Prince Yeondeok 연덕부원대군 왕훈
Grand Consort Wang of Samhan State 삼한국대비 왕씨
Lady Jo 조씨

== In popular culture ==
- Portrayed by Kim Jin-hae in the 1983 KBS TV series Foundation of the Kingdom.
- Portrayed by Kim Woong-chul in the 1983 MBC TV series The King of Chudong Palace.
- Portrayed by Kim Young-sun in the 1996–1998 KBS TV series Tears of the Dragon.
- Portrayed by Kim Byung-choon in the 2012–2013 SBS TV series The Great Seer.
- Portrayed by Nam Sung-jin in the 2014 KBS TV series Jeong Do-jeon.
- Portrayed by Lee Do-yup in the 2015–2016 SBS TV series Six Flying Dragons.
- Portrayed by Park Hyung-joon in the 2021 KBS1 TV series The King of Tears, Lee Bang-won.

== See also ==
- List of monarchs of Korea
- Goryeo

== Notes ==
Gongyang of Goryeo House of Wang Born: 9 March 1345 Died: 17 May 1394
Regnal titles
Preceded by King Chang	King of Goryeo; 1389–1392	Succeeded by none
