= Princess Suknyeong (Goryeo) =

Princess of Goryeo
- Reign: 1390–1392
- Coronation: 1390
- Successor: Princess Jeongsin
- Monarch: Wang Yo, King Gongyang
- Died: c.1394 Kingdom of Joseon
- Spouse: Wang Jib, Prince Ikcheon (m. 1390; died 1392); twelfth cousin
- House: House of Wang (by birth and marriage)
- Father: Gongyang of Goryeo
- Mother: Royal Consort Sun of the Gyoha No clan
- Religion: Buddhism

Princess Suknyeong (Korean: 숙녕궁주; Hanja: 肅寧宮主) was a Goryeo Royal Princess as the first and oldest daughter of King Gongyang and Royal Consort Sun. In 1390, she received her royal title along with her sisters, married Wang Jib, a descendant of King Jeonggan. However, both of them were executed after Yi Seong-gye established the new dynasty in 1392.
