= Gyoha No clan =

Korean clan from Gyeonggi Province

- Country: Korea
- Current region: Paju
- Founder: No O
- Connected members: Noh Kyung-eun; No Sung-ho; Soh Yeong Roh; Roh Tae-woo; Noh Hong-chul; Consort Sun

The Gyoha No clan (Korean: 교하 노씨; Hanja: 交河 盧氏) is a Korean clan. Its bon-gwan is Paju, Gyeonggi Province. According to census research in 2015, the number of Gyoha No clan members was 61,747. The clan's founder is No O, the 2nd son of No Hae, who hailed from T'ang China. No O was dispatched to Silla while he was a scholar at the Hanlin Academy in T'ang China.

== See also ==
- Korean clan names of foreign origin
