= Ch'oe Yunŭi =

Korean politician, publisher, and writer during the Goryeo Dynasty

- Hangul: 최윤의
- Hanja: 崔允儀
- RR: Choe Yunui
- MR: Ch'oe Yunŭi

Ch'oe Yunŭi (Korean: 최윤의; Hanja: 崔允儀) was a Korean inventor, politician, publisher, and writer during the Goryeo period. Ch'oe Yunŭi compiled the Sangjeong Gogeum Yemun (상정예문; 詳定禮文) with another 16 scholars. They collected all courtesies from ancient to present and published 50 copies. The publication of the Sangjeong Gogeum Yemun was very important for the Goryeo dynasty, because it established the system of official uniforms (that was still evolving at the time, during the 12th century), and thus the vertical rank of officials from king to subjects, specially during rituals. This was done to try to prevent conflicts of authority, and social unrest.

== Biography ==
Sangjeong Gogeum Yemun was published with movable metal type between 1234 and 1241. Yi Kyu-bo wrote the postscript on behalf of Ch'oe Yi, explaining how the book was published with movable metal type. According to this postscript, Choe Yi's father, Ch'oe Ch'ung-hŏn edited this book again because an older book lost some pages and the letters were unreadable. After he edited it, he copied two books and kept one copy in his home. Another book was kept in Yegwan, a unique research facility of Goryeo dynasty. By the time of the invasion of Mongol, he moved to Ganghwa Island and brought one copy of this book with him. Later, Ch'oe Yi published 28 copies of this book with movable metal type and sent them to be kept in several local governments' offices.

Also, owing to a long history of woodblock printing, Koreans of the period were accustomed to books, and literacy was high. The Chinese visitor Xü Jing, visiting Korea in 1123, observed in his travelogue that Koreans considered it shameful not to be able to read.

Goryeo kingdom records indicate that a major printing effort, the 50 volume Sangjeong Gogeum Yemun (Prescribed Ritual Text of the Past and Present) was printed with cast metal around the 21st year of reign of King Gojong of the Goryeo dynasty (around 1234 AD). It is conjectured that some familiarity with movable type must have been available prior to this large effort.

Another major publication, Nammyongcheonhwasang - Songjungdoga (Sermons of Song period Buddhist Priest Nammyongchon) was printed with cast metal type in the 26th year of the reign of king Gojong (1239 AD). However, whether Ch'oe Yunŭi was involved in this effort is not known.
