= Ch'oe Hang (military official) =

Military ruler of Korea (1209–1257)

Ch'oe Hang 최항

Military Leader of Goryeo
- In office 1249–1257
- Monarch: Gojong of Goryeo
- Preceded by: Ch'oe U
- Succeeded by: Ch'oe Ui

Personal details
- Born: 1209
- Died: 17 May 1257 (aged 47–48)
- Spouse(s): Lady Ch'oe; Lady Jo
- Children: Ch'oe Ui
- Parent: Ch'oe U (father)

- Ch'oe Hang
- Hangul: 최항
- Hanja: 崔沆
- RR: Choe Hang
- MR: Ch'oe Hang

Ch'oe Hang (Korean: 최항; Hanja: 崔沆; 1209 – 17 May 1257) was the third dictator of the Ch'oe military regime, which dominated Goryeo for six decades before and during the Mongol invasions. Ch'oe Hang continued on his predecessor Ch'oe U's anti-Mongol policy, and refused to surrender to the invaders. It is believed that the Ch'oe Military Regime began to decline during his eight-year reign.

== Background and rise to power ==
Ch'oe Hang was born the son of Ch'oe U, the second dictator of the Ch'oe Military regime, and a concubine. His grandfather, Ch'oe Ch'ung-hŏn, was the founder of the Ch'oe military regime, and the second head of the Ubong Ch'oe clan. Ch'oe Hang spent most of his youth in the Cholla Provinces studying Son Buddhism thought as a monk with his brother Manjong. Ch'oe Hang's father, Ch'oe U, originally intended for his son-in-law, Kim Yak-sŏn, and then his grandson, Kim Mi, to be his successors, but both were exiled and banished as a result of disagreements.

Choe Hang returned to lay life and became heir only after Choe U had Kim Yak-seon eliminated. Even then, Choe Hang’s designation as successor did not proceed smoothly. Kim Yak-seon’s faction, opposing Choe Hang, tried to promote Kim Yak-seon’s son, Kim Kyo, as Choe U’s heir. Given Choe Hang’s low maternal status and long absence from political life, many people—whether aligned with Kim Yak-seon’s faction or not—would have been reluctant to accept him. Moreover, Choe Hang’s activities as a monk drew criticism from officials: he was said to have gathered disciples and focused on amassing wealth. As the son of a ruler yet excluded from political power, this may have been his only source of satisfaction. In any case, his actions depleted state tax revenues, and his followers treated provincial officials with disdain, prompting condemnation from bureaucrats.

Upon seeing the need to secure an heir, Ch'oe U decided on establishing Hang as his successor. Despite strong opposition, Choe Hang was named heir but faced another crisis in the succession process. Ju Suk, a close aide to Choe Yi and senior military commander, resisted. Commanding the Night Patrol (Yabyeolcho) and both the Inner and Outer Dobang guard units, he sought to return power to the king. Ju Suk gave up his resistance when Choe Yi’s household slaves—Yi Gong-ju, Choe Yang-baek, and Kim Jun—aligned themselves with Choe Hang, after which Ju Suk cooperated. This meant that most of Choe Yi’s military forces supported Choe Hang’s succession. Ch'oe U called Hang in from the Cholla Provinces and placed him in the tutelage of some of Goryeo's finest scholars of the time. Hang was promoted to Minister of Revenue, and within a year, he entered into the Security Council. Around this time, Hang was given five hundred house soldiers. Finally, in the eleventh month of 1249, Ch'oe U died, after which the Ch'oe bodyguards almost instantly went to guard Hang's house. Nonetheless, Choe Hang still seemed insecure: the mourning period for Choe U lasted only two days, and Choe Hang shut himself away (“Du-mun bul-chul”), suggesting he lacked support from within the regime.

== Dictator ==
Upon officially becoming the next Ch'oe dictator in 1249, Ch'oe Hang took rapid steps to secure his position. He became the Euncheongwangnoktaebu (Grand Guardian of the Palace Guards), Chupiwonambussa (Vice-Director of the Privy Council), Eobupangseochasataebu (Chief Censor and Minister of War), and Taejabingak (Guest of the Crown Prince). He also concurrently served as the Tongseobuggyeongbyeongsasa (Commander of the Eastern, Western, and Northern Frontier Armies) and Gyeongjeonbyeolgam (Specially Appointed Censor).

=== Purge ===
He first eliminated officials, concubines and followers of his father, the greatest among which was the Tae family. Choe Hang was particularly jealous and sent into exile the Chupyonwansa (Privy Council Councillor) Min Hŭi and the Chupiwonambussa Kim Gyeong-son, who had previously gained popular support. He also killed the former Chupiwonambussa Ju Sok and the Hyeongbuseocang (Minister of Justice) Park Hwon. In 1251, he poisoned and exiled his stepmother Dae-ssi, and killed her son, her former husband, O Seung-jik, and Kim Mi’s uncle, Kim Kyŏng-son. Park Seon, who had condemned Choe Hang during his time as a monk, was also targeted, as was Ju Suk, who had initially opposed his succession.

Not all opponents could be removed. Figures like Kim Ji-dae, who had clashed with him as governor of Jeolla Province, and Song Guk-jam, who had reported his misconduct to Choe Yi, were left untouched due to concerns over bureaucratic backlash. Many of those opposed to Choe Hang were long-time loyalists of the Choe family, whose removal could spark wider defections, threatening the regime’s survival. Thus, Choe Hang had to focus on winning over existing officials. For example, he appointed to high office Jeong An—who had cooperated with Kim Yak-seon despite being the son of Jeong Suk-cheom—and Kim Gi-son, who was Kim Yak-seon’s younger brother and Kim Mi’s uncle. Such appointments suggest that a major reorganization of the political order under Choe Hang was impossible.

King Gojong bestowed the title of 'Duke of Chinyang', which was a title that Ch'oe U had been given, on Ch'oe Hang. Shortly after, Hang was promoted to the Head of Security Council, the Ministries of Civil Personnel and Military Affairs.

=== Governance ===
In the early stages of his rule, he exempted the separate tributes (byeolgong) and fishery taxes (eorangsen-se) from the local areas, and recalled the inspectors of the Gyeongjeontodam (Pacification Council) who had been extorting the people, assigning their duties to the an-chalsa (Inspectors-General), in an effort to gain popular support. However, he gradually indulged in luxury and pleasure, and killed many who displeased him.

Regarding policy towards the Mongols, in 1250 he built a new palace in Seungcheonbu (present-day Kaepung, Gyeonggi Province) in response to the Mongol demand to leave Ganghwa Island, but in 1252 he strongly opposed the king's plan to meet with a Mongol envoy there. During this time, he declined the king's offer to appoint him as Munhasisung (Chancellor) and Jinyugu (Duke of Jinyang). In 1253, he again declined the appointment as Munhasisung and Ipuosadaesa (Minister of Personnel and Grand Censor).

That year, the Mongol general Yagul invaded with a large army. He rejected a letter from the royal prince Wang Jun of Yeonnyeong, who was with the Mongols, urging him to send the crown prince or prince Aneungong Wang Chang to request a withdrawal. However, when the Mongols ravaged the country, the king went to the new palace in Seungcheonbu to receive the Mongol envoy, thus averting a crisis for the time being.

In 1254, he declined the king's order to establish a government office, but later became the Jungseoryeong Gamsuguksa (Director of the Secretariat and National Teacher). In 1256, he was enfeoffed as Jechungganmingongsin (Meritorious Subject Who Pacified and Benefited the People).

After his death, he was posthumously honored as the Duke of Jinpyeong.

== Evaluation ==
The Choe Hang government had limits not seen under Choe U. Notably, Choe Hang refused four royal offers to “receive a marquisate and establish a household” (Bonghu Ipbu). In Goryeo, when a marquis established a household, it conferred tangible authority and revenues befitting their rank, a move typically possible only when one’s political power was secure. Choe Yi had declined this early in his rule but accepted it in 1234 (Gojong 21), soon after moving the capital to Ganghwa and consolidating power. Choe Hang’s repeated refusal suggests he had never secured absolute authority.

Choe Hang could not firmly control the bureaucracy. Senior ministers like Choe Ja and Choe Rin strongly advocated peace with the Mongols, directly contradicting his stance. While under Choe U it was almost impossible to voice dissent, under Choe Hang political figures could openly express opposing views—an indication that he lacked the ability to reshape the political order.

Having faced strong opposition during succession, Choe Hang relied heavily on trusted aides—mainly household slaves like Yi Gong-ju, Choe Yang-baek, and Kim Jun, as well as Park Song-bi, Song Gil-yu, the scholar-officials Seon In-yeol and Yu Neung, and favored figures such as Yu Gyeong and Yu Cheon-u. These confidants wielded great power. For instance, Kim Jun, though only a junior officer of the 7th rank, was able to block the submission of an inspector’s report on General Song Gil-yu’s misconduct to the State Council—an act possible only because he was a favored aide.

It is natural for close aides to wield influence, but in Choe Hang’s case, the extent was far greater than under Choe Chungheon or Choe U. This shows how dependent he was on them and how little support he had among officials.

== Family ==
- Father: Ch'oe U (최우; 1166 – 10 December 1249)
- Mother: Lady Seo Ryeon-bang (서련방) – a prostitute.
- Wives and their issue(s):
  - Lady, of the Cheorwon Ch'oe clan (부인 철원 최씨) – No issue.
  - Lady, of the Hoengseong Cho clan (부인 횡성 조씨) – No issue.
  - Unnamed concubine
    - Ch'oe Ui (최의; 1238–1258)
  - Lady Sim Kyŏng (심경) – No issue.

== Popular culture ==
- Portrayed by Baek Do-bin in the 2012 MBC TV series God of War.

== See also ==
- Goryeo
- Ch'oe Ch'ung-hŏn
- Goryeo military regime

Preceded by Ch'oe U	Military Leader of Goryeo; 1249–1257	Succeeded by Ch'oe Ui

Preceded by Ch'oe U	Leader of Ubong Ch'oe Military regime (House of Ch'oe); 1249–1257	Succeeded by Ch'oe Ui
