= Jeonju Kim clan =

Korean clan from North Jeolla Province

Jeonju Kim clan Chŏnju Kim clan
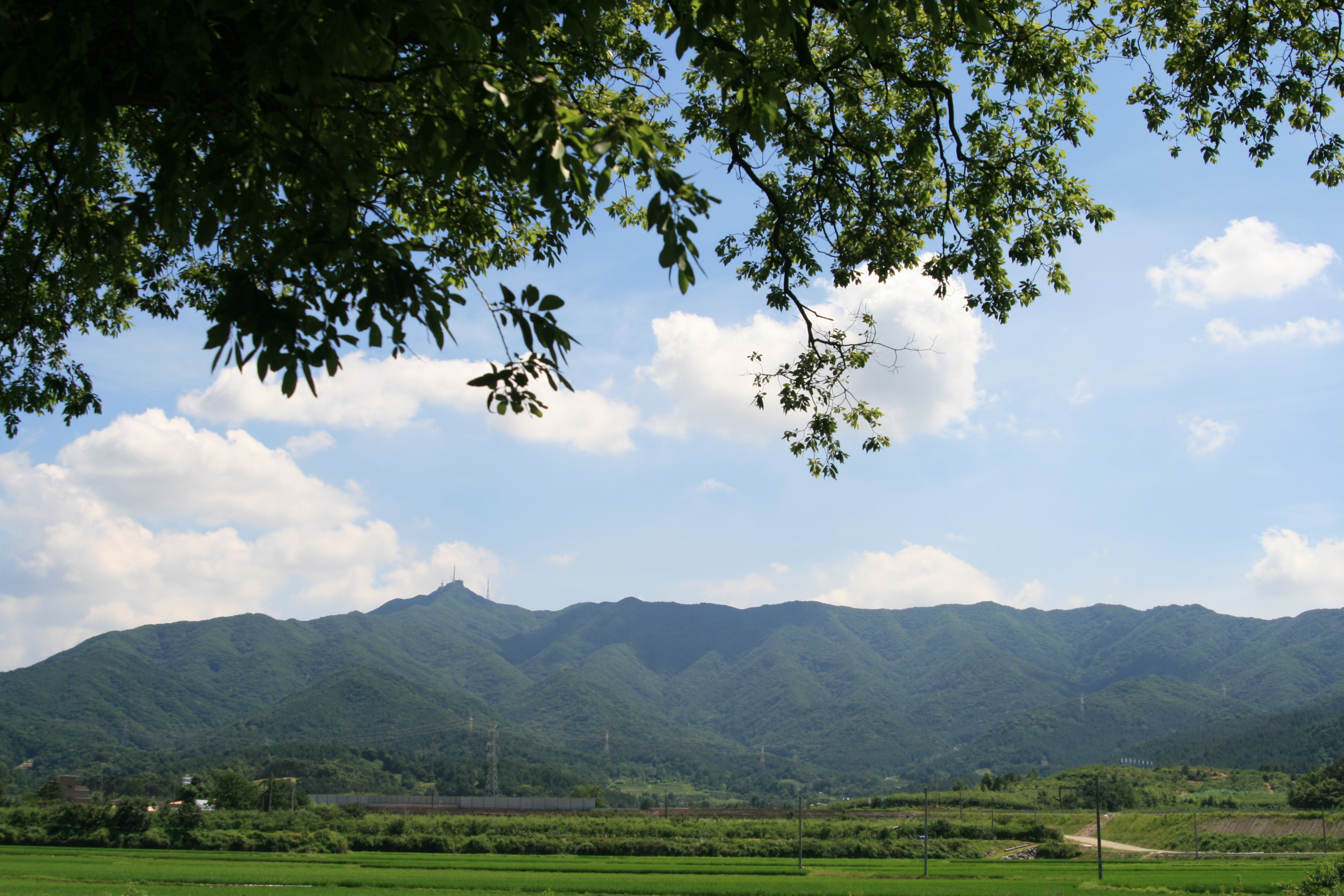
- Moaksan, the burial site of clan founder, Kim T'ae-sŏ
- Parent family: Buyeo royal family (disputed); Royal family of Silla (House of Park); Gyeongju Kim clan
- Country: North Korea and South Korea
- Current region: Jeonju, South Korea
- Founder: Kim T'ae-sŏ
- Members: Notable members: Queen Jeongsun (Wonjong); Kim Dong-in; Kim Yeong-cheol; Kim Jae-soon; Kim Hee-chul; Kim Il Sung; Kim Jong Il; Kim Jong Un; Kim Yong-nam
- Connected families: House of Wang (though Queen Jeongsun); Uiseong clan
- Distinctions: Xiongnu (Though Kim Sŏng-han; disputed); Chuge (Though Kim Sŏng-han; disputed)
- Cadet branches: Kim family

- Jeonju Kim clan
- Hangul: 전주 김씨
- Hanja: 全州 金氏
- RR: Jeonju Gimssi
- MR: Chŏnju Kimssi

The Jeonju Kim clan (Korean: 전주 김씨) is a Korean clan with the bon-gwan based in Jeonju. The founder of the clan is considered to be Kim T'ae-sŏ, a descendant of King Gyeongsun of Silla. As of the South Korean census of 2015, there are currently 56,989 members of the Jeonju Kim clan. The current North Korean Kim dynasty hails from this clan, as Kim Jong Un is the 34th generation descendant of Kim T'ae-sŏ.

Kim T'ae-sŏ's eldest son, Kim Yak-sŏn, was the son-in-law of Ch'oe U, the military dictator of Goryeo. Kim Yak-sŏn's daughter, later known as Queen Dowager Sungyeong, became the wife of King Wonjong, and the mother of King Chungnyeol. Kim T'ae-so's third son, Kim Kyŏng-son, became a general who resisted the Mongol invasions, fighting in the Siege of Kuju.

== See also ==
- Kim family (North Korea)
- Kim (Korean surname)
