= Queen Jeongsun (Wonjong) =

Korean queen (1222–1237)

Queen Jeongsun 정순왕후
- Grand Queen Dowager Sungyeong (순경왕태후; 順敬王太后)

Crown Princess of Goryeo
- Tenure: 1235–1237
- Coronation: 1235
- Predecessor: Crown Princess Im
- Successor: Crown Princess Yu
- Born: 1220; Goryeo
- Died: 29 July 1237 (aged 16–17); Sadang-ri, Ganghwa County, Goryeo
- Burial: 1244; Gareung tomb (Note: One of the four Goryeo Royal Tombs who left in South Korea, along with: Seokneung Tomb (석릉; 碩陵) – her first cousin twice removed in-law, King Huijong's tomb.; Golleung Tomb (곤릉; 坤陵) – her grandmother-in-law, Queen Wondeok's tomb.; Hongneung Tomb (홍릉; 洪陵) – her father-in-law, King Gojong's tomb.); San 16–2, Neungnae-ri, Yangdo-myeon, Ganghwa County, Incheon
- Spouse: Wonjong of Goryeo (m. 1235–1237)
- Issue: Chungnyeol of Goryeo an unnamed daughter
Regnal name
- Worthy Consort Gyeongmok (경목현비, 敬穆賢妃; given in 1235)
Posthumous name
- Given by Wonjong of Goryeo in 1262: Queen Jeongsun (정순왕후; 靜順王后); Given by Chungnyeol of Goryeo in 1274: Queen Dowager Sungyeong (순경태후; 順敬太后); Given by Emperor Wuzong of Yuan in 1310: Princess (Queen) Consort of Goryeo (고려왕비; 高麗王妃)
- House: Jeonju Kim clan
- Father: Kim Yak-sŏn
- Mother: Lady Ch'oe of the Ubong Ch'oe clan
- Religion: Buddhism

Queen Jeongsun of the Jeonju Kim clan (Korean: 정순왕후 김씨; Hanja: 靜順王后 金氏; 1220 – 29 July 1237) or known as Queen Gyeongsun (경순왕후; 敬順王后) and formally called as Queen Dowager Sungyeong (순경태후; 順敬太后), was the first and primary wife of Wonjong of Goryeo who became the mother of his successor, Chungnyeol of Goryeo.

== Biography ==
=== Early life ===
The future Queen Jeongsun was born in 1220 into the Jeonju Kim clan (Note: The clan was branched under the Gyeongju Kim clan) as the only daughter of Kim Yak-sŏn who was a descendant of Kim Al-ji. She was the granddaughter of Goryeo military dictator Ch'oe U, as her mother was Lady Ch'oe (최씨), the eldest daughter of Ch'oe U.

Through her paternal uncle, Lady Kim eventually became a first cousin twice removed to the future Queen Jeongan, wife of King Jeongjong of Joseon. Through her paternal grandmother, Lady Kim was also a fifth cousin twice removed of Queen Wongyeong, the wife of King Taejong and sister-in-law of King Jeongjong.

=== Marriage and death ===
In 1235, she married Crown Prince Wang Chŏng, and was given the royal title of Worthy Consort Gyeongmok (경목현비; 敬穆賢妃) and became his consort (황자비; 太子妃) not long after his appointment as a Crown Prince.

A year later, she gave birth into their eldest son (the future King Chungnyeol) but eventually died only at 17 years old on 29 July 1237 after giving birth to a daughter who believed to have died young as there are no records since then. After her husband ascended the throne, she was given a posthumous name of Queen Jeongsun (정순왕후; 靜順王后) in 1262 and after their son ascended the throne, King Chungnyeol bestowed the name of Queen Dowager Sungyeong (순경태후; 順敬太后) towards his mother in 1274.

In 1310, by the new order (제서; 制書) from Emperor Wuzong of Yuan, Kim was titled as Queen Consort of Goryeo (고려왕비; 高麗王妃) since she was the grandmother of the reign king and was said by Wuzong to be clean and prudent in her behavior, as well as gentle and beautiful in the Dharma, praising her diligence and modesty. Due to this, she became the last queen who received posthumous names like her predecessors in the early Goryeo period.

=== Tomb ===
In 1244 (31st year reign of her father-in-law, King Gojong), she was buried in "Gareung tomb" (가릉; 嘉陵) located at Neungnae-ri, Yangdo-myeon, Ganghwa County, Incheon which became one of the few Goryeo Royal Tombs located in South Korea. In 1992, it was designated as "Incheon Historic Site no. 370".

== Family ==
- Father: Kim Yak-sŏn (김약선; 金若先; 1193–?)
  - Grandfather: Kim T'ae-sŏ (1168–1257)
  - Grandmother: Lady Min of Yeoheung Min clan (여흥 민씨; 1168–?); eldest daughter of Min Sik (민식; 閔湜; 1143–1202)
- Mother: Choe Song-yi (최송이; 崔頌利), Lady Ch'oe of the Ubong Ch'oe clan (우봉 최씨; 1193–?)
  - Grandfather: Ch'oe U (최우; 1166 – 10 December 1249)
  - Grandmother: Grand Lady Pyŏn of the Hadong Chŏng clan (변한국대부인 하동 정씨; 1165–1231)
- Sibling(s)
  - Older brother: Kim Mi (김미; 金敉; 1218–?)
  - Younger brother: Kim P'il-yŏng (김필영; 1222–?)
  - Younger brother: Kim Wi-hang (김위항; 1229–?)
- Husband: King Wonjong of Goryeo (5 April 1219 – 23 July 1274)
- Issue
  - Son: King Chungnyeol of Goryeo (3 April 1236 – 30 July 1308)
    - Daughter-in-law: Qutugh Kelmysh, Queen Jangmok of the Yuan Borjigin clan (22 July 1259 – 11 June 1297)
      - Grandson: Yi Wang, Chungseon of Goryeo (20 October 1275 – 23 June 1325)
      - Unnamed granddaughter (공주; 1277–?)
      - Unnamed grandson (왕자; 1278–?)
  - Unnamed princess (공주; 1237 – ?)

== In popular culture ==
- Portrayed by Choi Da-eun and Bang Joon-su in the 2012 MBC TV Series God of War.
