= Kim Pongmo =

Goryeo government official

- Hangul: 김봉모
- Hanja: 金鳳毛
- RR: Gim Bongmo
- MR: Kim Pongmo

Posthumous name
- Hangul: 정평
- Hanja: 靖平
- RR: Jeongpyeong
- MR: Chŏngp'yŏng

Kim Pongmo (Korean: 김봉모; Hanja: 金鳳毛; ? – August 1, 1209 (Note: In the Korean calendar (lunisolar), he died on the 29th day of the 6th Lunar month of the 5th year of Huijong's reign (1209).)) was a Goryeo government official. His posthumous name was Chŏngp'yŏng and his clan was the Gyeongju Kim clan. He was the father of Kim T'aesŏ, the progenitor of the Jeonju Kim clan.

Kim was born in Kyerim (modern-day Gyeongju, South Korea). Kim's father, Kim Serin (김세린; 金世麟), served as the Vice Director of the Left of the Secretariat (상서좌복야; 尙書左僕射; sangsŏ chwa pogya). Kim Pongmo's first rank in the Goryeo officialdom was that of palace attendant (내시; 內侍; naesi), during the beginning of the reign of King Myeongjong. Kim's government post was gained via protected appointment, due to his prominent clan origin. In 1176, Kim helped crush rebel uprisings. The next year, Kim was appointed as a recorder in Myeongbokgung Palace (명복궁녹사; 明福宮錄事). Kim was appointed as the administrative provincial military commander (지병마사; 知兵馬事; chi pyŏngmasa) of Tongbungmyŏn. Kim was known for his knowledge of foreign languages such as Jurchen and Chinese. Due to his linguistic skills, he helped entertain foreign envoys from the Jurchen Jin dynasty who had come to investigate the sudden dethronement of King Myeongjong by Ch'oe Ch'unghŏn. In January 27, 1204, Kim was appointed as a vice commissioner of the Security Council (추밀원부사; 樞密院副使; ch'umilwŏnpusa).

He died on August 1, 1209. Kim held the office of the vice-director of the Chancellery (문하시랑평장사; 門下侍郎平章事; munhasirang p'yŏngjangsa) at the time of his death.
