= Ilchi Lee =

South Korean businessman (born 1950)

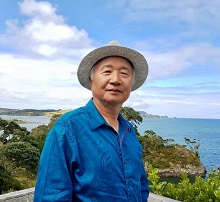
- Ilchi Lee in 2016
- Born: December 23, 1950 (age 75); Cheonan, South Korea
- Occupations: Educator, Author
- Website: www.ilchi.com Korea Institute of Brain Science

- Ilchi Lee
- Hangul: 이승헌
- Hanja: 李承憲
- RR: I Seungheon
- MR: I Sŭnghŏn

Art name
- Hangul: 일지
- Hanja: 一指
- RR: Ilji
- MR: Ilchi

Lee Seung-Heun (Korean: 이승헌; born December 23, 1950), better known as Ilchi Lee, is a South Korean author and the founder of a variety of mind-body training methods, including Body & Brain (Korean: Dahn Hak), Brain Wave Vibration, Kookhak Qigong, and DahnMuDo, all falling under the umbrella name "Brain Education" (formerly known as "Brain Respiration"). Lee started teaching his methods in a park in the 1980s, and since then, the practice has developed into an international network of for-profit and non-profit entities. Lee's practices have been criticized as pseudoscience.

== Early life and education ==
Ilchi Lee was born in 1950 in Cheonan, South Korea. His father was a teacher, yet he reports having struggled in school due to his inability to focus and a preference for imaginative play. Later in life, he would identify himself as having overcome Attention Deficit Disorder through rigorous physical and mental training. He suggests in his books that these early experiences formed the foundation of the brain-based training techniques he would develop later in life.

In his adolescence he turned to the martial art of Taekwondo to help calm his restless mind. He eventually earned a fourth-level black belt, and opened a successful martial arts studio. He took the first term of Taekwondo master education hosted by Kukkiwon in 1972. After he graduated from Dankook University in 1977 with a B.S. degree in clinical pathology and physical education, he opened a health clinic, which according to his own account did well. He soon married and settled down to raise a family.

However, Lee recounts that he was still plagued by questions about the meaning of human life and the universe, even while on the surface living an ideal life. Thus, in his early thirties he set out to engage in rigorous solo training in the wilderness of Korea's Moaksan. He engaged in 21 days of ascetic practice and meditation without food, sleep or lying down. He claims that through this training he gained insights that would provide the philosophical underpinnings of his methods.

== Career ==
Upon his return to ordinary civilization, he began to teach his methods in a community park, at first to only one stroke victim. It was at this point that he took the name Ilchi (일지; 一指), which means "finger pointing to the truth". Eventually, a larger group of people gathered in the park, and inclement weather necessitated that the classes be moved indoors. This led to the opening of the first Dahn Center in 1985 in Seoul, South Korea, which would grow to over 300 Korean centers in the early twenty-first century In 1991, the first Dahn Center opened in the United States. As of 2006, there were approximately 146 Dahn Centers in the United States. In the meantime, many corporates and government organizations, including Samsung Group, Hyundai, POSCO, and Ministry of National Defense of South Korea employed Lee's program for their employees. Chung Ju-yung, a former Hyundai CEO, Chey Jong-hyun, a former CEO of SK Corporation and Cho Soon, a former Vice Prime Minister of South Korea, took personal training from Lee. Lee has been given a letter of appreciation from Ministry of Government Administration and Home Affairs and Ministry of National Defense of South Korea. Korean religions scholar Dr. Hai Ran Woo describes Ilchi Lee's Dahn World Co. (formerly Dahn-Hak-Sonwon) as South Korea's largest 'New Age' (or 'self-cultivation') 'meditation industry' with sales reaching $280 million in 2005. Dahn World has described their spiritual products as the most lucrative of all Korean exports; they plan to expand to 36,000 training centers worldwide by 2010.

Korean religions scholar Donald Baker regards Dahn World as one of the more noteworthy among more than 200 new religions in South Korea that share a 'Korea-centric' view that Korea has become 'the spiritual center of the world' – with Dahn World asserting that Seung Heun Lee is a spiritual leader leading humanity toward an 'enlightenment revolution'.

In 2000, Ilchi Lee became a director of the Tao Fellowship, a non-profit religious charity and educational foundation, which purchased property in Sedona, Arizona to house the Sedona Ilchi Meditation Center (SIMC). According to their web site, the Tao Fellowship teaches and promotes Tao philosophy and provides training for a cultural movement for peace. The Sedona Ilchi Meditation Center is described as "the home from which the ideals of Tao Fellowship may flower and go forth to awaken the human consciousness," and as the location of 12 "energy vortexes". (Sedona is believed by many visitors and locals to contain healing "energy vortexes".) Described by Dr. Woo as the "heart of the 'world mission' or 'global management,'" SIMC hosts 3,000 participants annually from around the world in a variety of programs based in Lee's Brain Education system, including youth camps, residential healing, retreat programs and advanced Dahn training programs such as Dahn Healer School. Eventually SIMC was renamed the Sedona Mago Retreat Center (SMRC). ("Mago" means "Mother Earth" in Korean.)

According to his official website, Lee is no longer in direct management of the Dahn Centers, instead focusing on developing educational applications of his training system and serving as president of the consulting firm BR Consulting in Sedona, AZ, which provides services to corporations that provide his training programs, including management of trainer education programs, training and licensing of trainers, marketing and media relations, business analysis and planning.

On January 8, 2009, Lee held a seminar at the United Nations on "The Role of Brain Education in Global Mental Health," as the president of "International Brain Education Association". Coincided with the seminar, New York City declared this day "IBREA Brain Education Day," recognizing Brain Education's contribution to education, health and well-being of New York citizens.

Fifteen American cities including Atlanta, Cambridge, Las Vegas and San Francisco have declared Ilchi Lee Day, in recognition of Lee's contributions through his original Brain Education.

On September 12, 2018, Ilchi Lee received the award, José Simeón Cañas Slave Liberator Order, by the Ministry of Foreign Affairs of El Salvador as the president of IBREA Foundation, a non-governmental organization in special consultative status with the United Nations Economic and Social Council (ECOSOC) that Ilchi Lee founded. The award was for the culture of peace Lee's Brain Education program brought to El Salvador's public schools. Brain Education has been taught in Salvadoran schools since 2011, beginning with a pilot project in Distrito Italia, an area on the northern outskirts of the capital of San Salvador. Brain Education is a five-step mind-body method that includes brain exercises, meditation, and mindfulness training. At the time of the award, 2,357 educators in El Salvador had been certified to teach Brain Education, and the Ministry of Education and the Teacher Welfare Institute continue to support the program.

== Philosophy ==
Ilchi Lee considers the creation of world peace to be the ultimate goal of his training methods. Essentially, they are meant to facilitate a shift in human consciousness toward a more suitable world culture, according to Lee. He stresses a concept of personal enlightenment similar to those found in other Eastern philosophies, but emphasizes the need to take action based on that enlightenment. Appropriate action, according to Lee, should include some sort of action intended for the betterment of the human condition. Based on this notion, he has spearheaded what he calls the "HSP Movement," a movement intended to spread "health, happiness, and peace".

Lee also believes peace can only be achieved if humanity gives up nationalistic identities in favor of a single common identity. He contends that this identity should be rooted in people's mutual appreciation of and reliance upon the Earth, what he refers to as the "Earth Human" concept.

He believes that the Brain Wave Vibration training he created can help change negative thoughts which generate negative brain waves to positive ones, and understand the effects their actions have upon their brains.

In his book Human Technology, Lee asserts that people should become more self-sufficient in their own health care. Citing what he believes to be modern civilization's over-reliance on pharmaceuticals and specialized health care, he encourages people to rediscover what he regards as natural means of health maintenance, such as the traditional Asian methods discussed in the book, including acupressure and moxibustion.

The South Korean Government conferred the Order of Civil Merit on Lee in 2002, honoring his dissemination of Korean traditional philosophy and culture throughout the world through his founding of the Institute for Traditional Korean Cultural Studies (국학원 Gukhakwon, also known as the Kukhak Institute), an educational non-profit organization devoted to the study and development of traditional Korean philosophy

Through this and other affiliated NGOs and projects, such as 'Erecting 369 Tan-gun Statues in Schoolyards', which proved controversial in Korea in the late 1990s, Lee contributes to the revival of Korea's nationalist movement by mobilizing large numbers to revere Korea's legendary 2333 BCE divine founding father Tan'gun [or Dangun, Tan-gun, Dahngun], an indigenous tradition said to exist prior to the influence of foreign religions. Lee advances the belief that Tan'gun practiced a 15,000-year-old Korean value called 'Hongik Ingan Ewah Saegae' ('Widely benefit humanity, rightfully harmonize the world') and that an ancient scripture exists, 'Chun Bu Kyung' [or Cheonbugyeong], that reveals that Heaven, Earth, and Human exist as One in each person. Lee maintains that this is the core Korean spirit that will prove key to Korean reunification as well as world peace, an ideal he contends to be attainable through his 'brain education' programs - resulting in a 'one world communal culture' of perfectly healthy and peaceful 'Power Brains' or 'New Humans'.

== Training methods ==
Ilchi Lee's training methods have been described as focusing primarily on the brain and its development. Although actual practices resemble yoga, martial arts, meditation, and other recognizable Eastern disciplines, they have been modified with the said intent of uncovering the practitioner's natural brain potential. Lee's Power Brain Kids book describes that these practices may also be combined with other games and activities intended to develop mind-body connection and mental acuity. Collectively, the techniques have been termed Brain Education (formerly known as Brain Respiration or Brain Education System Training (BEST)).

Lee categorizes all of his training techniques under one or more of the five sequential steps that comprise Brain Education. The claimed focus of each step is as follows:

1. Brain Sensitizing: Stress management, awakening of the five senses, physical health, and brain awareness.
2. Brain Versatilizing: Enhanced learning ability through claimed creation of new synaptic connections.
3. Brain Refreshing: Emotional release, emotional control, and positive mental outlook.
4. Brain Integrating: Developing latent brain abilities and increasing communication between diverse parts of the brain.
5. Brain Mastering: Improved decision making and developing a clear sense of life purpose.

Lee teaches that while the brain is the primary focus of his training methods, the health of the physical body as a whole is of primary concern in the initial phase of training (Brain Sensitizing). Exercises and practices followed during this phase are heavily influenced by the notion of ki energy as it is understood in Traditional Korean medicine. This typically includes a variety of exercises that are said to be designed to open up the energy meridian system of the body and work to open up the body's seven major energy centers, known as chakras.

One of the mental and physical health enhancement techniques that Ilchi Lee created, Brain Wave Vibration (head-shaking), was used as a kind of moving meditation in a research study published in the international journal, Neuroscience Letters, in July 2010. Using two psychological questionnaires, this study suggested that regular practitioners of Brain Wave Vibration were less stressed and experienced more positive emotions and fewer psychosomatic symptoms. As well, regular Brain Wave Vibration practitioners had more dopamine in their blood than the healthy control group. The Ministry of Science and Technology of South Korea funded the research. Researchers from several departments of Seoul National University and the university hospital collaborated for the research along with the Korea Institute of Brain Science, of which Ilchi Lee is president.

Lee says that although the underlying philosophy has remained the same, he continues to "refine and improve" the methods. He recounts in one newspaper report that the techniques have evolved from breathing methods to meditation to its current emphasis on the brain. An early English-language book by Lee, Dahn Meditation, which was published in 1997, focuses primarily on Ki development through Lee's "practical and modern" version of traditional Korean Dahn Hak techniques and does not mention any exercises specific to brain development. The book describes stretching exercises ("do-in"), meditation for energy sensitivity ("ji gam"), energy dance ("dahn mu"), and energy building exercises ("haeng gong").

== The Call of Sedona ==
In 2011, Lee wrote The Call of Sedona: Journey of the Heart and it is published by BEST Life Media. It has been listed as a New York Times Best Seller. It was on the Washington Post Best Seller, USA Today Best Seller, LA Times Best Seller, and the IndieBound Best Seller lists. This book made the author the first Korean author to rank on the four major bestseller lists in the United States.

In The Call of Sedona, Ilchi Lee shares his personal memoirs and the inspirations he received in Sedona, Arizona. Among these were claimed experiences of being visited in his mind, (in meditation) by Lester Levenson, a master who had recently dropped his body, who urged Lee to buy his Sedona Method group's Sedona retreat property, which Lee later bought after much vacillation, due mainly to the price, but he found a way to handle it. The book also provides a range of advice on meditation and spirituality that claims to benefit anyone. Though millions of visitors are drawn each year to Sedona, Arizona's red rock formations, Lee believes there is much more to be gained than what can be seen with the eye. Recounting his own experiences, he here tells how readers can find inner strength and guidance by experiencing the spirit of Sedona. According to one review, "The Call of Sedona offers powerful guidance for all people seeking to connect with their inner selves, nature, and the spirit of this magical region."

Lee is donating 30% of his royalties from the sale of his book to three Sedona area charities: Camp Soaring Eagle, Yavapai Big Brothers Big Sisters, and the Sedona Community Center.

== Controversy ==
=== Criticism ===
Ilchi Lee's brain education claims have been described as pseudoscience by Ben Goldacre in his Guardian column and by Brian Cummings, a neuroscientist at the University of California, Irvine.

Lee's organization has also been described as a cult by American mental health professional and author who specializes in the area of cults, Steven Hassan.

=== Lawsuits ===
==== Death of Julia Siverls ====
In 2005, a wrongful death lawsuit was filed against Lee and other defendants over the death of Julia Siverls, a Body & Brain center member, during a training hike. The plaintiffs claimed that she was "drugged and killed". On November 13, 2006, the Court dismissed all claims against Lee, finding that "There is no evidence that Dr. Siverls-Dunham's death, or even her presence in Arizona, arose out of a transaction of business by Lee."

==== Barba et al. v. Lee et al. ====
In Barba et al. v. Lee et al. (Case No. CV-09-1115-PHX-SRB) filed in May, 2009, twenty seven former members and employees of Body & Brain sued Lee, Body & Brain, and other defendants in the State of Arizona for fraud, undue influence, unfair and deceptive business practice, emotional distress, wage and hour law violation and civil RICO.

The Court dismissed ten plaintiffs in 2012. The other seventeen plaintiffs withdrew and settled the case by mutual release. No money was paid to any of the plaintiffs by any defendants in this case. On the other hand, a judgment was entered against seven of the dismissed plaintiffs awarding defendants $11,072.07 in litigation costs.

Two plaintiffs acknowledged that they brought this lawsuit primarily because of the misrepresentations made by their former attorney Ryan Kent about their claims and his ability to handle their case.

This case was finally dismissed entirely on April 1, 2013, by court order.

Jessica Harrelson filed emotional distress claims against Lee in both the Barba et al. v. Lee et al. case and another case filed in the State of Massachusetts. On January 31, 2012, the United States District Court for the District of Massachusetts dismissed Harrelson's case, finding that "Lee filed a motion... providing the court with a number of exhibits that tended to disprove, or at the very least, shed serious doubt, on Harrelson's substantive claims." On April 6, 2012, Harrelson was also dismissed in the Barba et al. v. Lee et al. case for failure to prosecute.

== Published works in English ==
- Dahn Meditation. Dahn Publications. 1997. ISBN 89-87293-00-9.
- The Way to Light Up Your Divinity. Dahn Publications. 1999. ISBN 89-87293-06-8.
- Healing Society. Hampton Roads. 2000. ISBN 1-57174-189-5.
- Unchain Your Soul Through Mago's Dream: Communing with the Earth's Soul. Healing Society. 2002. ISBN 0-9720282-0-X.
- The Twelve Enlightenments for Healing Society. Hampton Roads. 2002. ISBN 1-57174-335-9.
- Healing Chakra: Light to Awaken My Soul. Healing Society. 2002. ISBN 0-9720282-4-2.
- Brain Respiration: Making Your Brain Creative, Peaceful, and Productive. Healing Society. 2003. ISBN 0-9720282-3-4.
- Peaceology for Healing Society. Healing Society. 2003. ISBN 0-9720282-6-9.
- Meridian Exercise for Self-Healing: Classified by Common Symptoms. 2 volumes. Healing Society. 2004. ISBN 0-9720282-7-7 | ISBN 0-9720282-8-5
- Home Massage Therapy. 2 volumes. Healing Society. 2004. ISBN 0-9720282-9-3 | ISBN 1-932843-00-0
- Dahnhak Kigong: Using Your Body to Enlighten Your Mind. Healing Society. 2004. ISBN 1-932843-01-9.
- Human Technology: A Toolkit for Authentic Living. Healing Society. 2004. ISBN 1-932843-12-4.
- Power Brain Kids: 12 Easy Lessons to Ignite Your Child's Potential. Healing Society. 2007. ISBN 978-1-932843-19-4.
- Principles of Brain Management: A Practical Approach to Making the Most of Your Brain. BEST Life Media. 2007. ISBN 978-0979938801.
- Lee, Ilchi; Jones, Jessie (2008). In Full Bloom: A Brain Education Guide for Successful. BEST Life Media. ISBN 978-0979938849.
- Brain Wave Vibration: Getting Back into the Rhythm of a Life. BEST Life Media. 2008. ISBN 978-1-935127-00-0.
- The Call of Sedona: Journey of the Heart. Scribner. 2012. ISBN 978-1451695809.
- Living Tao: Timeless Principles for Everyday Enlightenment. Best Life Media. 2015. ISBN 978-1-935127-83-3.
- The Solar Body: The Secret to Natural Healing. Best Life Media. 2015. ISBN 978-1-935127-81-9.
- Belly Button Healing: Unlocking Your Second Brain for a Healthy Life. Best Life Media. 2016. ISBN 978-1-935127-91-8.
- The Power Brain: Five Steps to Upgrading Your Brain Operating System. Best Life Media. 2016. ISBN 978-1935127864.
- Lee, Ilchi (2017). I've Decided to Live 120 Years: The Ancient Secret to Longevity, Vitality, and Life Transformation. Best Life Media. ISBN 978-1935127994.
