= Kim Seong-han =

Kim Seong-han may refer to:

- Kim Seong-han (baseball) (born 1958), South Korean baseball player
- Seonghan of Silla, Korean royalty
- Kim Seong-han (novelist) (1919–2010), South Korean novelist
