= Sundo (disambiguation) =

Sundo may refer to:

- Sundo, a Philippine film
- Sundo (song), a song by Imago
- Sundo (monk) (順道, or Shundao in Chinese), a monk in Goguryeo
