= Ch'oe Ŭi =

Military ruler of Korea (1233–1258)

Ch'oe Ŭi 최의

Military Leader of Goryeo
- In office 1257–1258
- Monarch: Gojong of Goryeo
- Preceded by: Ch'oe Hang
- Succeeded by: Kim Chun

Personal details
- Born: 1233
- Died: 1258 (aged 24–25)
- Spouse: Lady Lee
- Children: -
- Parent: Ch'oe Hang (father)

- Ch'oe Ŭi
- Hangul: 최의
- Hanja: 崔竩
- RR: Choe Ui
- MR: Ch'oe Ŭi

Ch'oe Ŭi (Korean: 최의; Hanja: 崔竩; 1233–1258) was the fourth and last Ch'oe dictator of the Ubong Ch'oe Military regime.

== Early life ==
When he was born in 1233, his father was Choe Hang, and his mother was his Ch'oe U’s concubine. In 1257, Ch'oe Ŭi became military leader of Goryeo after his father's death. He was known for his handsome appearance, quiet demeanor, and reticent personality, as well as for being very shy. Although his mother was a servant, since Choi Hang's legitimate wife had no children, he was chosen to continue the family line. In his youth, he studied poetry and calligraphy under Ye Gi (芮起), politics under Gwon Wi (權韙) and Im Ik (任翊), and ceremonial rites under Jeong Se-sin (鄭世臣).

In 1255 (the 42nd year of King Gojong's reign), Choe Ui became Palace Internal Attendant (전중내급사) and was granted a red leather belt (홍정, 紅鞓). When his father died in 1257, Seon In-yeol (宣仁烈), Yu Neung (柳能), and others, along with Jeon Jeon (殿前) and Choi Yang-baek (崔良伯), gathered forces such as the Yabyeolcho (夜別抄), Shinuigun (神義軍), Seobang Sambon (書房三番) and Dobang (도방) to protect him, ensuring that he succeeded his father's power. As a result, the king appointed him Acting General (차장군) and allowed him to inherit the title of Chief Controller (Gyojeongbyeolgam, 敎定別監). Becoming Chief Controller meant he was the de facto military ruler. King Gojong then tried to appoint him as Deputy Commissioner of the Privy Council and Minister of State Affairs (추밀원부사 판이병부어사대사), but Choe Ui declined.

== Dictator ==
Immediately after taking power, Choe Ui sought to restore public trust: he opened granaries to feed the starving, returned the royal properties Yeonan Residence (연안택) and Jeongpyeong Palace (정평궁) to the royal household, contributed 2,570 seok of rice from his household to the royal treasury (Naejangtaek), and offered cloth, silk, oil, and honey to Daebu Temple. He also donated 2,570 seok of rice to the royal granary and, due to a poor harvest, opened his own warehouse to provide relief to officials like the Gwonmudaejeong (權務隊正), Geunjang Jwauwi (近仗左右衛), Shinhogwi Kyowi (神虎衛校尉), and the common people of the capital districts. That same year, he was appointed Ubu Seungseon (右副承宣, Vice Minister of the Right).

In July of the same year, the king again tried to appoint him Deputy Commissioner of the Privy Council and Minister of State Affairs (추밀원부사 판어사대사), but he declined, later becoming Second Vice Director of the Royal Secretariat (우부승선). Around that time, a man named Min Cheng (閔偁) escaped from Mongolia and reported that Mongol ministers secretly agreed not to invade the East again. Pleased, Choe Ui rewarded him with a house, rice, and clothes, and appointed him to an honorary post.

Although he initially made efforts to gain public support, he failed to secure the backing of the senior officials in Gangdo (강도, modern Ganghwa Island) due to his low birth status as the son of a servant. So he relied heavily on close aides who had helped him succeed to power. Moreover, the good governance of his early reign did not last long. In 1258, he appointed General Byeon Sik (邊軾) and Nangjang (郎將) An Hong-min (安洪敏) as harvest commissioners in Ganghwa (Ganghwa Suhwek-sa (江華收獲使)) engaging in plunder under the guise of collecting harvests. Even during famine, he did not release grain for relief, losing much public trust.

He disregarded wise scholars and trusted only his frivolous associates like Choi Yang-baek (崔良伯) and Yu Neung (柳能). When famine struck, he failed to provide relief and lost the support of the people.

Traditionally, slaves could not receive official ranks even if they rendered great service, instead being rewarded with money or cloth. However, following his father’s precedent of promoting household slaves—like Yi Gong-ju (李公柱), Choe Yang-baek (崔良伯), and Kim In-jun (金仁俊, later renamed Kim Jun)—to officer positions, Choe Ui promoted Yi Gong-ju to Captain (낭장, Nangjang (郎將)). This was the first instance of slaves being appointed to higher official ranks.

== Mu-On Coup ==
Although Choe Ui followed the policies of his grandfather Choe U and father Choe Hang, persistent opposition from the royal family and high ministers gradually weakened his power. Meanwhile, the long-debated issue of the king’s or crown prince’s personal attendance at the Mongol court was being strongly pressed by Mongolia. In Goryeo, moves were underway to send the crown prince to Mongolia. Furthermore, the massive sixth Mongol invasion exceeded the defensive limits of both the populace on the mainland and the government in Ganghwa. Sensing crisis, some factions sought peace through the prince’s visit to Mongolia and aimed to eliminate the Choe Military Regime, which was seen as an obstacle to negotiations.

Upon Choe Ui’s succession, these aides split into factions. Kim Jun resented being sidelined in favor of Choe Yang-baek and Yu Neung. Rivalries for a ruler’s favor are common among such confidants, but when the ruler lacks a strong political base, such conflicts intensify. Choe Ui, like his father, was of low maternal status—his mother was a servant of General Song Hyu—and was young, increasing his dependence on aides. Unable to reconcile their disputes, his regime was doomed.

In March 1258, Byeoljang (別將, a military officer) Kim Jun (金俊) put forward Choe On, the Minister of the Privy Council, General Park Seong-jae, Doryeong Nangjang (都領郎將) Im Yeon (林衍), and Daesaseong (大司成, a high-ranking academic official) Yu Gyeong (柳璥) as the main plotters. Choe On was Choe Hang’s father-in-law and a member of the Cheorwon Choe clan, one of the highest aristocratic families of the time, closely intermarried with Choe Chungheon’s family. Park Seong-jae had been a guest-retainer of Choe Hang. By presenting such well-connected figures as ringleaders, Kim Jun sought support from those close to the regime.

Choe On and Park Seong-jae cooperated, showing that many once closely tied to the Choe family were now dissatisfied and that Choe Ui’s removal had effectively been decided in advance. The Night Patrol (Yabyeolcho), Divine Righteous Army, and Dobang guards were used in the coup. Since these units had long served as the Choe family’s private troops, it is clear Choe Ui was overthrown by the very military forces the regime had relied on. In the end, the Choe Regime—built on a strong autocratic system—was destroyed from within, and the political power that followed fell into the hands of figures who had once been its closest associates.

== Family ==
- Father: Ch'oe Hang (최항; 1209 – 17 May 1257)
  - Grandfather: Ch'oe U (최우; 1166 – 10 December 1249)
  - Grandmother: Seo Ryeon-bang (서련방)
- Mother: Unnamed concubine
- Wives:
  - Lady Yi of the Inju Yi clan (부인 인주 이씨) – No issue.
  - Lady Sim Kyŏng (심경) – No issue.

== In popular culture ==
- Portrayed by Baek Jong-Min in the 2012 MBC TV series God of War.

Preceded by Ch'oe Hang	Military Leader of Goryeo; 1257–1258	Succeeded by Kim Chun

Preceded by Ch'oe Hang	Leader of Ubong Ch'oe Military regime (House of Ch'oe); 1257–1258	Succeeded by None
