= Dongguk Yi Sangguk jip =

1241 Korean book

Dongguk Yi Sangguk jip (Korean: 동국이상국집; Hanja: 東國李相國集) or the Collected Works of Minister Yi of Korea is a Korean compilation book written in 1241 by Goryeo scholar Yi Kyu-bo. It is one of the books that mentions the founding myth of Goguryeo.

== History ==
The book consists of 53 volumes, and was woodblock printed. Ham(涵), the son of Yi Kyu-bo, edited and published the first 41 books and the last 12 books were published in December in the same year. In 1251, yik-bae(益培), grandson of Yi Kyu-bo, corrected and complemented the content by the order of then king of goryeo in an institute called bunsadaejangdogam(分司大藏都監). The book was edited several times in the Joseon dynasty, but judging from the words of Joseon scholar Yi Ik, some of the lost volumes of the book was retrieved from Japan. The current edition is thought to be a reconstruction during the reign of king Yeongjo.

== Content ==
=== First 41 volumes ===
The prologue was written by Lee Soo(李需). The first through 18th books contain poetry. Book 20 contains a biography section. Book 21 contains novels.

=== Last 12 volumes ===
These volumes contain a section dealing with the first king of Goguryeo, which has been of interest to historians.
