= Sundo =

Korean meditation practice

Kouk Sun Do 국선도
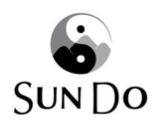
- Also known as: Sundo
- Focus: Internal Style, Taoist, Meditation
- Country of origin: South Korea
- Official website: Kuk Sun Do Federation; SunDo Taoist Healing Arts US; Fédération Francophone de Sin Moo Hapkido, Sundo et disciplines associées a.s.b.l.

- Sundo
- Hangul: 국선도
- Hanja: 國仙道
- RR: Gukseondo
- MR: Kuksŏndo

Sundo - also known as Kouk Sun Do (국선도) (Note: Mainly used in South Korea. Internationally, the name Sundo is used.) - is a Korean Taoist art based on meditation, and which aims at the personal development of its practitioners, both at the physical, mental and spiritual levels.

Through the practice of meditation, abdominal breathing and holding positions, the practitioner cultivates his “Ki” (vital energy, also called Qi in Chinese), and develops flexibility, physical ease, health and serenity.

Rather similar to Indian Yoga or Chinese Qigong arts like Tai chi, Sundo has its origins in the mountains of present-day Korea, millennia ago; The particularity of this art is the extreme richness of the exercises according to the level of the practitioner, which allows a smooth progression adapted to the rhythm of life of modern humans.

Sundo (Hangul: 선도; Hanja: 仙道) should not be confused with Sunmudo (Hangul: 선무도; Hanja: 禅 武 道). Although their pronunciations appear similar, the former is a Taoist health practice based on static postures and meditation, while the latter is a Buddhist martial art based on dynamic movements.

== History and development ==
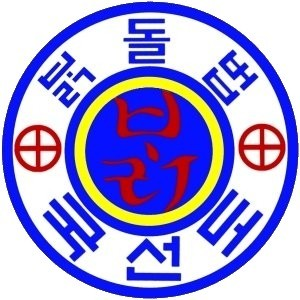
Old symbol of Sundo

The Sundo has very ancient roots, which go back to ancient Korea, in Northeast Asia. (Note: The legend places its foundation more than 9800 years ago, according to the masters, but its practice is only attested from the period of the Three Kingdoms.)

Practiced for centuries under the name of "Taoism of the Mountain" (San Saram), it recently took the name of Kouk Sun Do (or Kukson-do, the characters Hangeul and Hanja being the same for both spellings) in homage to its institutionalization in the Kingdom of Paekche by the order of Samrang (also called "Kukson") in 320 A.D - after the unification of the Three Kingdoms (Koguryo, Silla and Paekche) by the order of Hwarang, some practitioners of Kouk Sun Do retired to the mountains in order to freely practice their art and thus ensure its sustainability.

Since then, the practice of Kouk Sun Do has been passed down secretly among Taoist mountain monks, from teacher to student, for generations. It was not until 1967 that the monk Chung-Woon sent his disciple Be-Kyung to teach Kouk Sun Do to the rest of the world.

=== Be-kyung ===
Be-Kyung's original name was Chung-San (Eng. "the Blue Mountain"). In the late 1940s, as a child, Chung-San encountered a Taoist monk on the mountain named Chung-Woon (Eng. "Clear Clouds"). Legend has it that Chung-Woon offered to teach Chung-San how to break stones with his bare hands if he agreed to follow him, who would have agreed.

Thus began the training of Chung-San in Kouk Sun Do with Chung-Woon and his master Moo-Woon (Without Cloud). In 1967, after twenty years of Asceticism and training, Chung-Woon asked Chung-San to leave the mountain to go and spread the ancient wisdom of Kouk Sun Do to the world. On this occasion, Chung-San was renamed Be-Kyung (the Secret Frontier) by his master. Following some demonstrations of the benefits of his art, Be-Kyung opened the first Kouk Sun Do school in 1970 in Seoul.

Initially, Be-Kyung taught all of the practices he had inherited from the Kukson monks: martial arts (Su Sul) and internal arts (Kouk Sun Do); then he concentrated on the internal practice, the most important to him. During this period, he wrote two books available only in Korea: one chronicling his life as a hermit with Chung-Woon, the other containing more information about the Kouk Sun Do itself. (Note: Its story, objectives, practice etc.)

In 1983, after making sure that his former students would disseminate his art in turn, Be-Kyung returned peacefully to his life as a Taoist monk in the mountains. Among the twelve masters trained by Be-Kyung, Hyun-moon Kim is the one who spread Sundo the most beyond the borders of Korea.

=== Hyun-moon Kim ===
In 1979, after several years of training under the direction of Be-Kyung, Hyun-moon Kim introduced the Sundo to the West, particularly the United States, Canada and Europe.

Doctor of Philosophy, Master Hyun-moon Kim combines ancestral Korean wisdom and modern Western psychology to teach Sundo Taoist principles, with a view to personal development aimed at improving the quality of life of his students. He is the author of a book on Taoism and related practices, titled "The Tao of Life".

He has opened a Sundo school in West Hartford, Connecticut, and holds numerous Instructor training retreats in Barnet, Vermont. Master Kim divides his time between his Sundo dojang in the United States and the courses he gives at the Hanseo University in South Korea. He is also president of the International Institute for Sundo-Taoist Cultural Research (IISCR) in Tangjin, South Korea.

== International spread ==
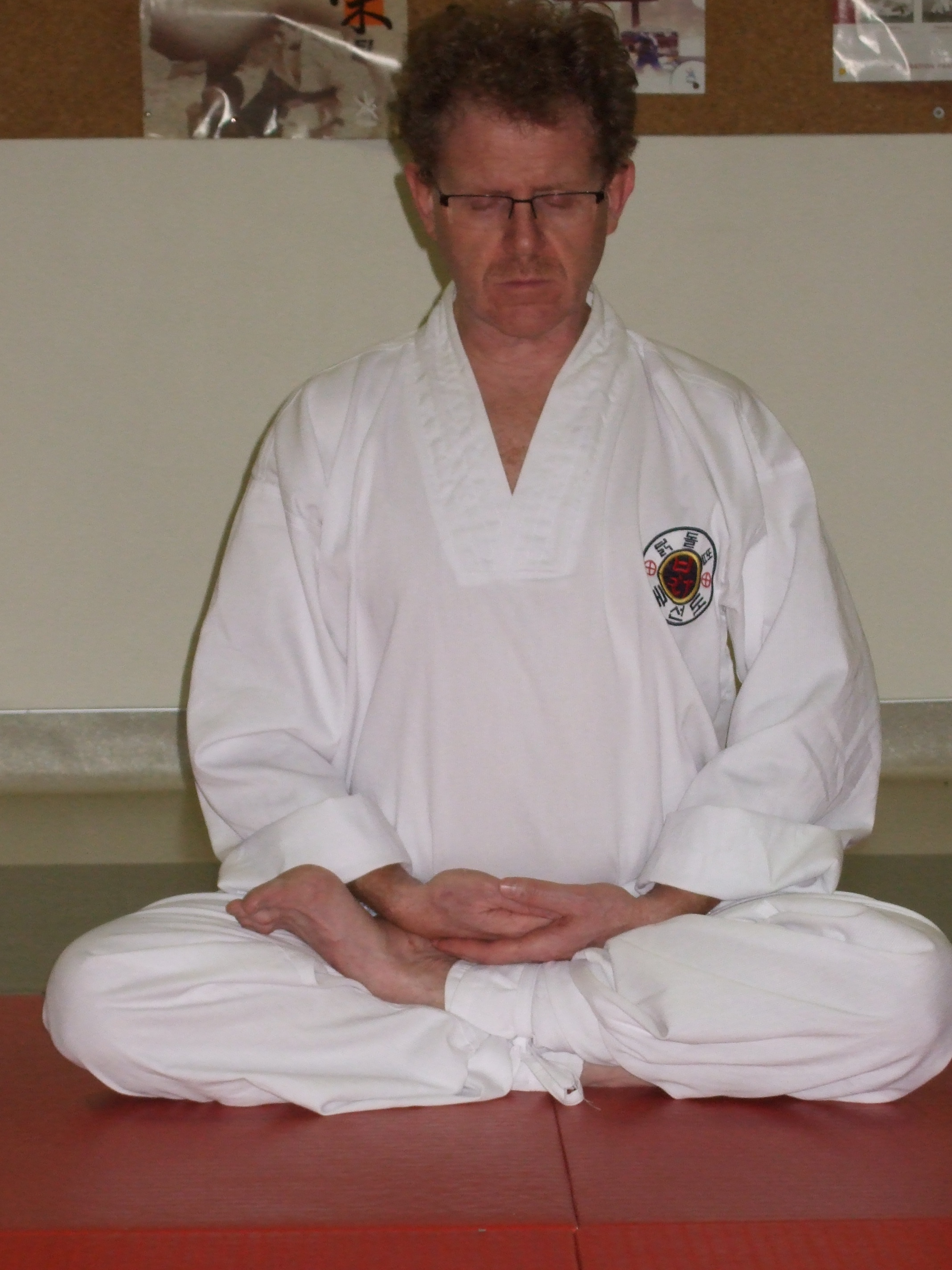
Master Philippe Lewkowicz, representative for France of the Kouk Sundo Federation

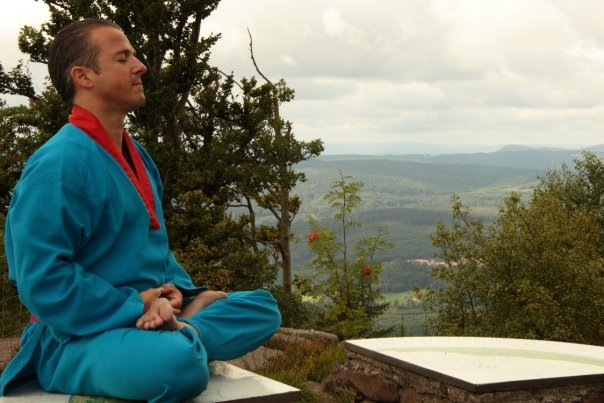
Master Nicolas Tacchi, president of the Francophone Federation of Sin Moo Hapkido, Sundo and associated disciplines

Sundo is one of the largest health and wellness entities in South Korea, with significant bases in France and Eastern European countries, like Czech, Romania and Russia.

Nowadays, Sundo has spread throughout South Korea, this tradition has become a national treasure of the country. It is practiced by a wide variety of people, regardless of their religious and political beliefs and type of activity: heads of large enterprises and students, monks and politicians, blue-collar workers and celebrities.

The organizations promoting Sundo are Kuksundo World Federation, World Kuksundo Federation, and Deokdang Kukseondo.

=== In South Korea ===
The World Kukseondo Federation currently has about 300 dojangs across South Korea, which trains body and mind based on Korean Danjeon breathing, meditation, and martial arts. The organization is seeking international expansion.

=== France ===
The main mover of Sundo in France is Philippe Lewkowicz - who is currently the representative for France of the International Sundo Federation. He has been practicing martial arts since 1980 and it was in 1987 that he was introduced to Sundo with Master Hyunmoon Kim. Having lived twenty years in the United States, Master Philippe Lewkowicz spent several years learning and mastering Sundo techniques from Master Hyunmoon Kim, and he finally obtained the Sundo master's degree in 1996 in Korea. Back in France for professional reasons, Philippe Lewkowicz continued to work on the development of Sundo.

Nicolas Tacchi is also another major mover of the art. Tacchi is an expert in Korean martial arts: he is the president of the Francophone Federation of Sin Moo Hapkido, Sundo and associated disciplines. He began practicing Sundo with Master Philippe Lewkowicz in the early 2000s, then with Master Hyunmoon Kim, with whom he took part in several courses in France as well as a retreat in Vermont, in order to become an instructor of Sundo.

Tacchi is also a professional musician at the Opéra National de Lorraine since 1985 and has spread the Sundo among professional musicians and students in the prevention of pathologies due to the performing arts in general and to the practice of a musical instrument in particular. As part of this project, he worked between 2008 and 2012 at INSET Nancy. Many conservatories around the world have already included internal practices similar to Sundo in their curriculum to improve the breathing and posture of musicians. More generally, Sundo is a highly beneficial internal practice in a context of regular stress related to professional activity, and can therefore be recommended as part of campaigns to fight against anxiety within a company, or quite simply for the well-being of employees. He currently teaches in Nancy, at MJC Lillebonne.

=== Czech ===
The European SunDo Association is based in the Czech Republic which can be found via the www.sundoclub.cz website.

As breathing is becoming more needed as a tool to help mental and physical health, parts of the Sundo breathing meditation can be used for different activities/classes with people of all ages to help balance the mind-body-spirit system. Sundo provides complex and useful techniques for different needs - postural, stretching and strengthening for the body, calming the mind, and mainly centering for the energy, getting the body organised then in harmony knowing its centre.
Nurturing lower danjeon is long term deep transformation for practitioners dedicated to regular practice of sundo, which can be considered part of neigong inner qigong family practices.

== Practice of Sundo ==
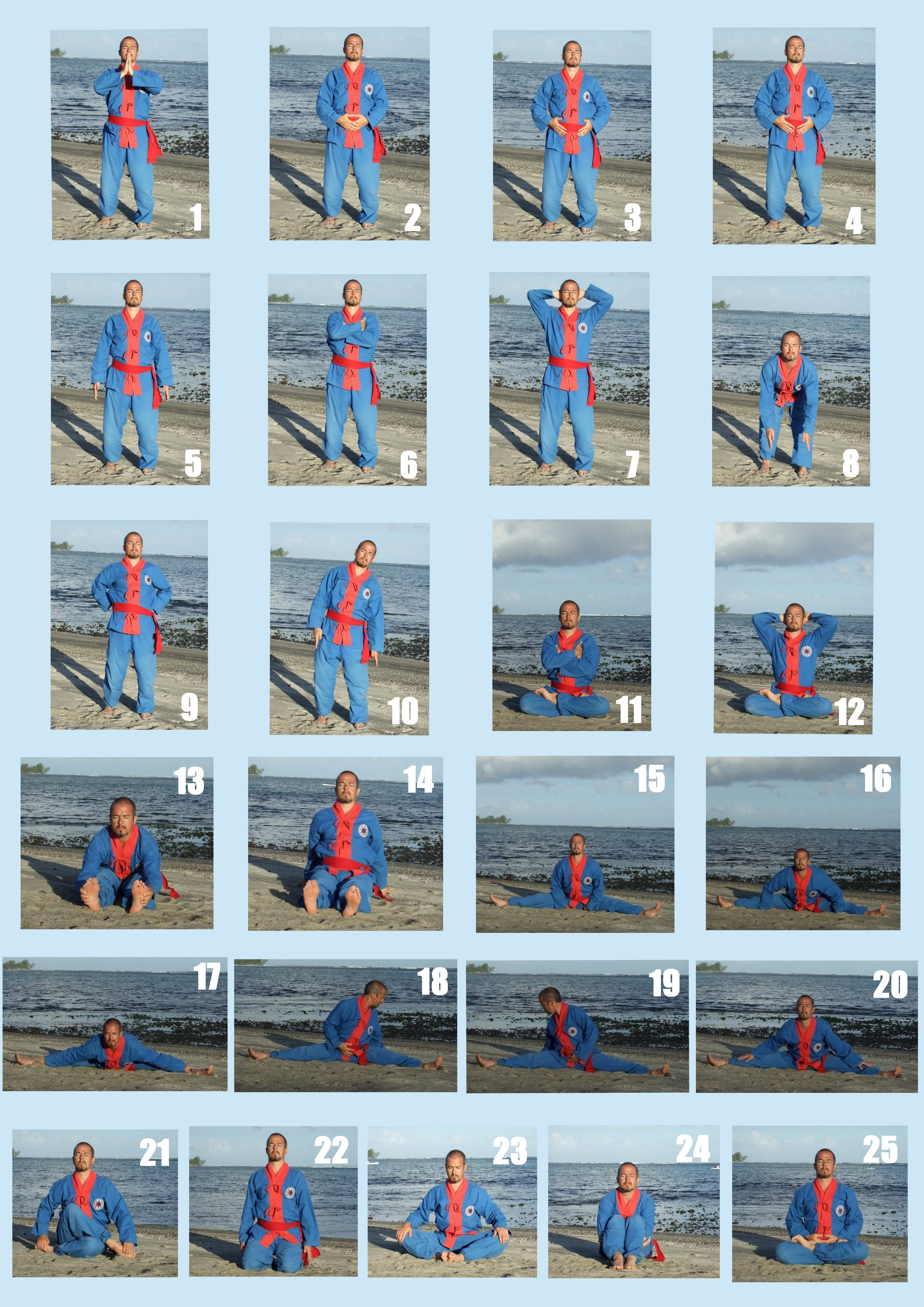
First form of Sundo

Sundo is a technique aimed at stimulating internal energy (called "Ki" by the Japanese and Koreans, "Qi" or "Chi" by the Chinese), through breathing exercises, postures and to meditation. The energy thus gathered is then used to establish and maintain the various balances: physical, emotional and spiritual.

Sundo's theoretical approach is the same as in acupuncture: by acting on the meridians of the body, you achieve a state of relaxation, inner calm, and you also strengthen your immune system, thus balancing the body and mind. The basic Sundo exercises, although very gentle, also greatly improve flexibility and physical ease, which allows the practitioner to feel their best in their body. Finally, at the end of assiduous learning, the practitioner tackles the deep meditation exercises, which complete their inner development.

The purpose is to actually develop the strength of the mind and improve the personality that can control oneself through the practice of Sundo. It is not actually the purpose of performing danjeon breathing to exert instantaneous powers such as accumulating and destroying energy through breathing.

=== Typical session ===
A Sundo session begins with a "long warm-up" (about half an hour), consisting of stretching and self-massage, designed to relax the body and prepare it for the exercises that follow.

Then comes the part "Meditation" (the heart of the work), lasting 40 minutes, during which the practitioner stimulates his energy and his body by exercises of holding positions (25 positions for beginners, only one for masters), coupled with deep abdominal breathing called "Danjeon breathing", the difficulty of which varies according to the level of practice.

Finally, the session ends with a series of stretching and twisting exercises intended to circulate energy through the meridians to each internal organ, and to free the body and muscles from all the blockages related to sedentary life. This third and final part also includes some rhythmic muscle strengthening exercises.

While Sundo practice is optimal when done daily, performing two or three sessions per week is already enough to experience major improvements in physical and mental well-being.

Practitioners are also invited to take part in retreats organized by the Instructors several times a year. The pedagogical progression of Sundo is done through "forms" (akin to taolu), which correspond to the sequence of postures to be performed in the second part of the session. Regularly, a change of Tableau leads to a change of belt, up to the black belt, like many Korean and Japanese martial arts.

=== Progression ===
Sundo can be practiced at all ages, at all levels, whatever the initial physical condition. As they progress through the forms, the students approach, step by step, and without ever forcing, exercises of increasing difficulty.

The progression varies according to the frequency and the quality of the practice. Once a red belt, the practitioner can be awarded the title of Instructor, then Senior Instructor, and finally Teacher (Sa Bom Nim). There are five levels of practice in the Sundo:

- Jung Ki Dan Boup - white belt then white and yellow: "Refocus" → 2 forms of 25 postures
- Keon Gon Dan Boup - yellow belt: "Uniting the Energy of Heaven and Earth" → 1 form of 23 postures
- Won Ki Dan Boup - red belt, red and blue belt and blue belt: "Working with the Primordial Energy of the Universe" → 3 x 10 form of 12 postures
- Chook Ki Dan Boup - gray belt: "Feed the Primordial Energy" → 1 form of 5 postures
- Jin Ki Dan Boup - black belt: "Working with Transformed, Pure Energy" → one posture.

The first three tables correspond to the beginner, intermediate and advanced levels, up to the yellow belt. Then come another 31 forms.

=== Advantages ===
From the general point of view, Sundo practice and yoga practice have similarities. The fundamental is a method of regaining health through balance and harmony of the body through the way of moving the body while properly breathing, which is the source of human life.

== See also ==
- Choi Kwang-Do
- Sin Moo Hapkido
- Falun Gong
- Body & Brain / Dahn Yoga
- Neijia
