= God of War (South Korean TV series) =

2012 television series about Kim Jun

- Promotional poster
- Also known as: Mooshin; Warrior K
- Genre: Historical period drama; Action
- Created by: Kim Jeong ho MBC
- Written by: Lee Hwan-kyung
- Directed by: Kim Jin-min; Kim Heung-dong
- Starring: Kim Joo-hyuk; Kim Gyu-ri; Jeong Bo-seok; Park Sang-min; Joo Hyun; Lee Joo-hyun; Hong Ah-reum
- Composer: Ma Sang Woo
- Country of origin: South Korea
- Original language: Korean
- No. of episodes: 56

Production
- Producers: Kim Ho jun Joosun
- Running time: 70 minutes
- Production company: MBC

Original release
- Network: Munhwa Broadcasting Corporation
- Release: February 11 – September 15, 2012

God of War (Korean: 무신; RR: Musin; lit. 'Soldier'), also known by the alternative title, Warrior K, is a 2012 South Korean television series starring Kim Joo-hyuk as the real-life historical figure Kim Jun who was written about in the Goryeosa. It aired on MBC from February 11 to September 15, 2012, on Saturdays and Sundays at 20:40 for 56 episodes.

== Plot ==
Kim Jun is the son of an escaped palace slave, who gets raised by monks. Years later, after being torn from his home during wartime, Kim Jun must renounce his pacifist ways to partake in a deadly game that could be his ticket to freedom from his masters, Choe Chung-heon's clan. During the Mongol invasions of Korea, Kim Jun rises in the ranks to become the top military official, and eventually rules the Goryeo empire for 60 years in place of its king.

== Cast ==
- Kim Joo-hyuk as Kim Jun
- Kim Gyu-ri as Choe Song-yi
- Jeong Bo-seok as Choe Woo
- Park Sang-min as Choe Yang-baek
- Joo Hyun as Choe Chung-heon
- Lee Joo-hyun as Kim Yak-sun
- Hong Ah-reum as Wol-ah/An-shim
- Kang Shin-il as Monk Soo-beop
- Park Sang-wook as Lee Gong-ju
- Jung Sung-mo as Choe Hyang
- Baek Do-bin as Choe Hang
- Sora Jung as Choe Woo's first wife
- Jung Ho-bin as General Song Gil-yoo
- Kim Young-pil as General Park Song-bi
- Noh Young-guk as General Daejib Sung
- Chun Ho-jin as Lee Gyu-bo
- Ahn Byung-kyung as Kim Deok-myung
- Kim Cheol-ki as General Kim Kyung-son
- Park Hae-soo as Kim Yun-hu
- O Yeong-su as Monk Soogi
- Park Dong-bin as Hong-ji
- Ahn Jae-mo as Im Yeon
- Jin Seon-kyu as Gab-yi
- Kim Hyuk as Man-jong
- Kim Yoo-mi as Choe Woo's second wife
- Lee Seok-joon as Lee Jang-yong
- Lee Seung-hyo as King Gojong
- Im Jong-yoon as General Choe Choon-myung
- Kim Jung-hak as Monk Jin-pyo
- Kim Ha-eun as Choon-shim
- Choi Jae-ho as General Ryu Song-jeol
- Yun Cheol-Hyeong as General Choe Jun-mun
- Jo Eun-sook as Gan-nan of Tobang kitchen
- Go Soo-hee as Nan-jang of Tobang kitchen
- Yoo Na-young as Yeon-shim
- Yoon Dong-hwan as General Tanku of the Mongol Empire
- Kim Joo-young as General Lee Won-jeong of Cheolju fortress
- Lee Dong-shin as Commander-in-chief Sartai of the Mongol Empire's troops (1st and 2nd invasion)
- Kim Myeong-Kuk as Kublai Khan
- Choi Deok-moon as General Lee Hee-juk of Cheolju fortress
- Choi Soo-rin as Lee Hee-juk's wife
- Kwon Tae-won as General Park Seo of Kwiju fortress
- Kim Yong-woon as Gu-pil
- Jo Sang-gu as General Putau of the Mongol Empire
- Baek Won-kil as Kyun-ga
- Seo Kwang as Woo-ga
- Choi Min as Kang Woo-moon
- Jung Sun-il as General Joo-sook
- Choi Kyu-hwan as Yoo-jung
- Ha Soo-ho as Hwangbo Joon-chang
- Jang Tae-sung as Won-bal
- Kim Yun-tae as Amoogan
- Seung-kyu as Kim Hong-chee
- Bae Jin-sub as General Oh Seung-jeok
- Lee Seung-hyung as Ryu Neung
- Jeon No-min as General Moon Dae (cameo)
- Lee Hee-jin as Nan-yi (cameo)

== Awards and nominations ==
Year	Award	Category	Recipient	Result
2012	MBC Drama Awards	Top Excellence Award, Actor in a Serial Drama	Kim Joo-hyuk	Nominated
2012	MBC Drama Awards	Top Excellence Award, Actor in a Serial Drama	Jeong Bo-seok	Nominated
2012	MBC Drama Awards	Top Excellence Award, Actress in a Serial Drama	Kim Gyu-ri	Nominated
2012	MBC Drama Awards	Excellence Award, Actor in a Serial Drama	Park Sang-min	Nominated
2012	MBC Drama Awards	Excellence Award, Actor in a Serial Drama	Lee Joo-hyun	Nominated
2012	MBC Drama Awards	Excellence Award, Actress in a Serial Drama	Hong Ah-reum	Nominated
2012	MBC Drama Awards	Best Young Actress	Noh Jung-ui	Nominated

== International broadcast ==
It aired in Thailand on Channel 5 from April 21 to December 30, 2015.
