= Princess Jeonghwa =

12th-century Korean princess

Wang To-in
- Princess Jeonghwa (정화택주; 靜和宅主)
- Spouse: Ch'oe Ch'ung-hŏn
- Issue: Ch'oe Ku; Unnamed son (became a Buddhist monk)
- House: Wang
- Father: Wang O, King Gangjong
- Religion: Buddhism

Korean name
- Hangul: 왕도인
- Hanja: 王道人
- RR: Wang Doin
- MR: Wang Toin

Royal title
- Hangul: 정화택주
- Hanja: 靜和宅主
- RR: Jeonghwa taekju
- MR: Chŏnghwa t'aekchu

Wang To-in, known by her title of Princess Jeonghwa, was the illegitimate daughter of Gangjong of Goryeo and the second wife of Ch'oe Ch'ung-hŏn. According to Goryeosa, her existence can be confirmed by the record: "Ch'oe Ch'ung-hŏn accepted King Gangjong's illegitimate daughter as his second wife". After marriage in 1214, she was given the title of Taekju (택주; 宅主) which could only be used for princesses.

Despite being the King's daughter, she was not recognized or treated accordingly due to her mother's status. Her father was expelled to Ganghwa-do until his re-recognition by Ch'oe in 1211 at the age of 60 years old. She was forced to marry her family's enemy Ch'oe, who was 3 years older than her father Gangjong. After marriage, she lived with the pain of her paternal families, a husband who wielded uncontrollable power and an attempt to kill her. This was presumed to be the reason for her devout belief in Buddhism. After Ch'oe's death, she continued to practice meditation, became a Buddhist nun.
