= Kim T'aesŏ =

Goryeo government official (fl. 13th century)

- Hangul: 김태서
- Hanja: 金台瑞
- RR: Gim Taeseo
- MR: Kim T'aesŏ

Posthumous name
- Hangul: 문장
- Hanja: 文莊
- RR: Munjang
- MR: Munjang

Kim T'ae-sŏ (Korean: 김태서; Hanja: 金台瑞; ?–1257) was a Goryeo government official and the progenitor of the Jeonju Kim clan. He held various government posts such as Hallim Academician (한림학사) and Vice-Director of the Chancellery (문하시랑평장사; 門下侍郎平章事; munhasirang p'yŏngjangsa). He was the ancestral lineage of Kim Il Sung, the founder of North Korea as the 34th generation in the Far East.

Kim T'ae-sŏ was the son of Kim Pong-mo, and a descendant of the royal family of Silla via King Gyeongsun's son Prince Daean. In 1232, he became a Hallim Academy Scholar and served as an assistant examiner (동지공거) of the state examination. His top post would be that of Vice Prime Minister. He served through the reign of five kings: Myeongjong, Sinjong, Huijong, Gangjong and Gojong. According to the Goryeosa, he was said to have revered Confucianism, but was not fond of writing. He was the father of three sons: Kim Yak-sŏn, Kim Ki-son (김기손; 金起孫), and Kim Kyŏng-son. Two of them served in military offices while one served as a civil official. In 1254, he moved his family from Gyeongju to Jeonju due to the ongoing Mongol invasions of Korea. Due to the O Sŭngjŏk incident, in 1251, his family assets were forfeited. In 1257, he died and was given the posthumous name of Munjang. He was buried on Moaksan, in North Jeolla Province, South Korea.
