= Body & Brain =

Korean new religious movement

Body & Brain Yoga Tai Chi
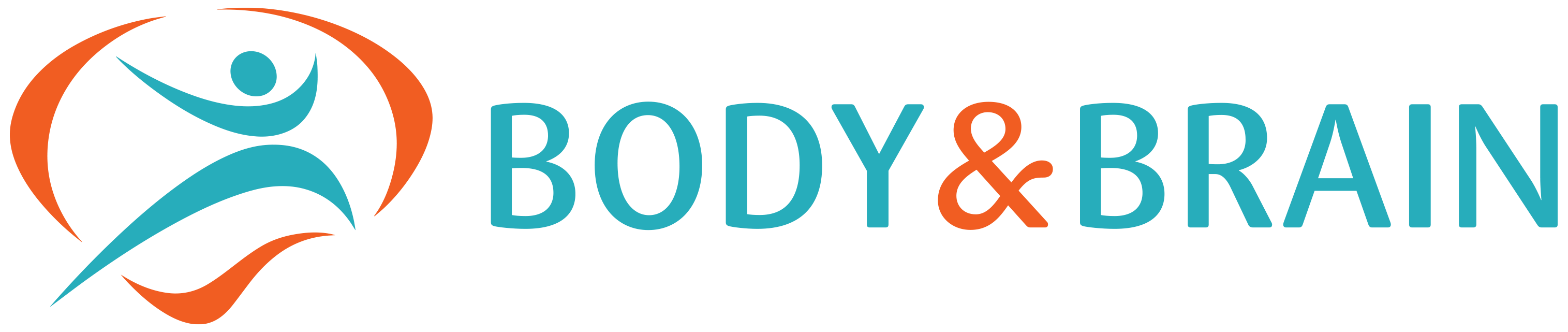
- Type: Privately held
- Industry: Health and Wellness
- Founded: June 18, 1996
- Founder: Ilchi Lee
- Headquarters: Mesa, AZ, USA
- Number of locations: 70+ locations nationwide
- Area served: USA
- Key people: Nobuko Todd (President); Hee Nam Kim (Executive Director); Temani Aldine (VP and Gen. Counsel)
- Products: Wellness & Self-Care Products
- Services: Personal Wellness Classes, Private Coaching
- Number of employees: 210
- Website: https://www.bodynbrain.com/

Body & Brain (Korean: 단월드; RR: Dan Woldeu; MR: Tan Wŏltŭ; also known as Dahn World, Dahn Hak, or Dahnhak), formerly called Dahn Yoga, is a corporation founded in 1985 by Ilchi Lee that teaches a Korean physical exercise system called Brain Education, which is considered pseudoscience. In Korean, dahn means "primal, vital energy", and hak means "study of a particular theory or philosophy". Body & Brain is taught through for-profit studios as well as community centers.

== Training methods ==
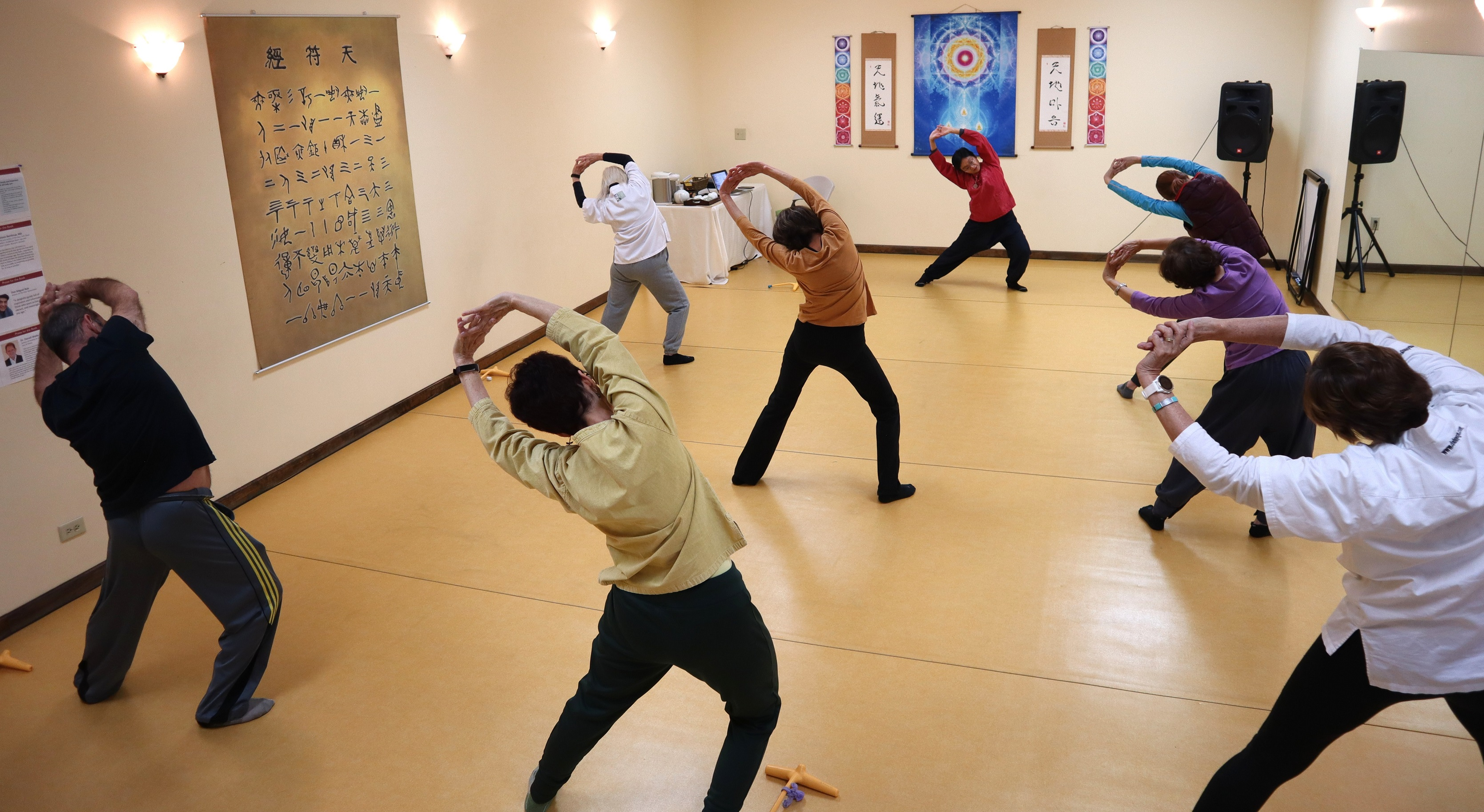
People practicing yoga at a Body & Brain Center.

Body & Brain draws upon traditional notions of ki, also known as chi or qi. A typical class begins with what is called "Meridian Stretching" exercise and follow a sequence of postures which include elements of meditation.

An article from Weill Cornell Medical College published in the Journal of General Internal Medicine concludes that participant reported "moderate improvements after 3 months of practice" with increased scores "in all [of the surveyed] domains of health-related quality of life, fewer depressive symptoms, less trait anxiety, and greater self-efficacy".

=== Brain Wave Vibration ===
Brain Wave Vibration is promoted as a mental and physical health technique. As part of CNN's investigation into Dahn Yoga, Neurosurgeon Dr. Sanjay Gupta was asked about testimonials that Brain Wave Vibration "lowered blood pressure, corrected lazy eyes, [and] even reduced symptoms of multiple sclerosis" and stated that the notion of vibrating the brain or other parts of the body to turn parts of the brain on and off is not grounded in science and that anecdotes are not empirically verifiable.

In 2010 a study sponsored by Ilchi Lee's Korean Institute of Brain Science (KIBS) and published in Neuroscience Letters showed subjects who engaged in Dahn Yoga led meditation reported lower levels of stress compared to the control group, which did not practice any sort of meditation. Another KIBS-sponsored study published in Evidence-Based Complementary and Alternative Medicine showed that Brain Wave Vibration meditation reduced stress similarly to Iyengar Yoga and Mindfulness meditation.

=== Brain Education ===
The tradenames ''Brain Education'', and ''Brain Education Systems Training'' (or BEST), refer to a system of exercises, breathing, and stretches developed and promoted by Ilchi Lee. Dr. Ben Goldacre of the U.K. criticized Ilchi Lee's brain education claims as pseudoscience in his Guardian column "Bad Science" in 2004.

== History ==
In 1985 the first Dahn Yoga Center opened in downtown Seoul. By 1990, fifty locations were teaching Dahn Yoga in South Korea. In 1991, the first U.S. Dahn Yoga Center was opened in Philadelphia, Pennsylvania. In 1997 the Sedona Ilchi Meditation Center (SIMC) was established in Sedona, Arizona.

Lee cohosted a conference in Seoul, South Korea, on June 15, 2001, called the New Millennium World Peace Humanity Conference. A document outlining Lee's vision, titled the "Declaration of Humanity," was signed by attendees, including Maurice Strong and Seymour Topping.

The Dahn Yoga Foundation was created in 2006, offering classes at senior centers, community centers, churches, public parks, offices, schools and hospitals. Dahn Yoga Foundation volunteers participate in community service projects.

In 2015, Dahn Yoga changed its name to Body & Brain.

== Controversy ==
There have been accusations that the organization operates a manipulative "cult" that uses coercive persuasion and thought reform methods to create deeply devoted Dahn masters (teachers) who persuade others to devote all their time, energy, and money to Body & Brain programs, events, and ceremonies, and to become loyal Dahn masters themselves.

On January 5, 2010, CNN broadcast a critical report about the organization with interviews of former Brain & Body members alleging severe physical, mental and financial abuse by Brain & Body personnel and staff, including one former member stating she was coerced into donating funds to the organization by taking out student loans totaling over US$40,000. Allegations were dismissed in the United States District Court for the District of Arizona August 25, 2010.

Rolling Stone Magazine published an article in March 2010 entitled "The Yoga Cult" alleging that "Dahn's calling itself 'yoga' is just a marketing ploy to enhance its appeal to Americans;" that instead it is a mind control cult designed to part people from their money. According to the article, the group brought in $30 million in the U.S. in 2009 and charges as much as $100,000 for a seminar.

An article in Forbes magazine in July 2009 contained similar allegations against Body & Brain. It reported allegations by former members that they were pressured to train to become paid "Dahn Masters," paying up to $10,000 each for workshops that lasted as long as three weeks. If students could not afford the training, the article states, they were encouraged to take out loans and carry credit card debt. Plaintiffs in a suit against the group claim that once they became "Dahn Masters" they were then given recruitment and revenue quotas that had them working up to 120 hours per week.

The "Brain Training Center", formerly "Dahn World", was reported on by Korean magazine Religion and Truth for deceptive advertising, targeting seniors over 60 with claims of reversing aging by 30 years. It operates a high-cost program called "Jangsaeng School (Kindergarten)," charging up to 5 million KRW, and promotes exaggerated claims such as drinking "Hwangjasu" water to regain youth. Investigations revealed that the products in question were manufactured in residential homes or warehouse-like facilities. Additionally, inventions developed by disciples were patented under Ilchi Lee and his family's company, allowing them to collect royalties.

== See also ==
- Yoga
- New religious movements
- New religious movements and cults in popular culture
