= Kim Yaksŏn =

Goryeo government official (fl. 13th century)

- Hangul: 김약선
- Hanja: 金若先
- RR: Gim Yakseon
- MR: Kim Yaksŏn

Posthumous name
- Hangul: 장익
- Hanja: 莊翼
- RR: Jangik
- MR: Changik

Kim Yaksŏn (Korean: 김약선; Hanja: 金若先; fl. 13th century) was a Goryeo official. The son-in-law of Ch'oe U, he was the military ruler's heir apparent until his death.

== Biography ==
Kim Yaksŏn was the first-born son of Vice-Director of the Chancellery Kim T'aesŏ, hailing from the Jeonju Kim clan. Kim would marry Lady Ch'oe, the daughter of Ch'oe U, due to Kim's prestigious background as a descendant of the Gyeongju Kim monarchs who ruled Silla.

In 1219, When Ch'oe U's father, Ch'oe Ch'unghŏn, was near death, Ch'oe U entrusted his son-in-law, Kim, to attend to Ch'oe's father as Ch'oe sought to protect his succession. In 1235, Kim Yaksŏn's daughter, the future Queen Jeongsun, became the consort of then crown prince Wang Chŏng, the future King Wonjong. As the father-in-law of the future king, Kim was appointed as vice commissioner of the Security Council (추밀부사; 樞密副使; ch'umilpusa).

As Kim Yaksŏn's father-in-law, Ch'oe U, had no legitimate-born sons but only daughters, Kim was the heir to Ch'oe U as the military leader of Goryeo. However, Kim's wife, the daughter of Ch'oe U, committed adultery with a male servant. When Kim Yaksŏn discovered his wife's affair, to cover up the incident she made a false accusation against her husband. Kim was put to death due to his wife's false accusation. The exact nature of the accusation has not been recorded in history, however it is thought that it must have been equivalent to treason for Ch'oe U to sentence his own heir apparent to death. The truth was later discovered and Kim was given the posthumous name of Changik.
