= Ch'oe U =

Korean general (1166–1249)

Ch'oe U 최우

Military Leader of Goryeo

Imperial Guardian
- In office 1219–1249
- Monarch: Gojong of Goryeo
- Preceded by: Ch'oe Ch'unghŏn
- Succeeded by: Ch'oe Hang

Personal details
- Born: 1166 Kaesong, Kingdom of Goryeo
- Died: 10 December 1249 (aged 82–83)
- Spouse(s): Lady Chŏng; Lady Tae
- Children: Lady Ch'oe; Choi Manjong; Ch'oe Hang
- Parent: Ch'oe Ch'unghŏn (father)
- Relatives: Kim Yaksŏn (son-in-law)

- Ch'oe U
- Hangul: 최우
- Hanja: 崔瑀
- RR: Choe U
- MR: Ch'oe U

Ch'oe U (Korean: 최우; Hanja: 崔瑀; 1166 – 10 December 1249), also known as Ch'oe I (최이; 崔怡), was a military ruler and official during the later Goryeo period, serving in various positions such as Assistant Executive in Political Affairs, the minister of personnel and war, and Censorate superintendent. Ch'oe U's posthumous title was Kwangnyŏl (匡烈). His exact birth year is unknown, but he died in 1249 . His ancestral seat was Ubong, now known as Gimcheon in Hwanghae Province. Ch'oe U was the son of Ch'oe Ch'unghŏn. After Ch'oe Ch'unghŏn died in 1219, Ch'oe U ruled the Ch'oe military regime until 1249, becoming the second ruler of the Ch'oe family's military government. His first name was Ch'oe U, but he later changed it to Ch'oe I. During his rule, Goryeo faced many hardships, including the Mongol invasion of Korea, which led to the relocation of the capital from Gaegyeong to Ganghwa Island.

== Early life ==
Ch'oe U was the eldest son of Ch'oe Ch'unghŏn, who founded the Ch'oe military regime. Ch'oe Ch'unghŏn had five sons and one daughter from three wives. Ch'oe U was born to the first wife, Lady Song, the daughter of general Song Ch'ŏng. His full brother, Ch'oe Hyang (최향; 崔珦), was a rival for succession but was suppressed throughout Ch'oe U's rule and eventually eliminated in 1230 after a failed rebellion.

The exact year of Ch'oe U's birth is not recorded, but given that Ch'oe Ch'unghŏn was born in 1149, Ch'oe U was likely born around the time of the military coup in 1170. This would make Ch'oe U in his twenties when Ch'oe Ch'unghŏn seized power in 1196 (the 26th year of King Myeongjong's reign). There is no record of Ch'oe U's role in his father's coup. He first appears in historical documents in 1202 when a rebellion broke out in Gyeongju, and Ch'oe Ch'unghŏn and Ch'oe U inspected the departing troops. There is little notable about Ch'oe U's activities before his father's death. Records indicate that in 1208, the king temporarily resided at Ch'oe Ch'unghŏn's residence and watched the royal guards play polo there. Ch'oe U did not engage in any significant political activities during this time. However, as Ch'oe Ch'unghŏn's power solidified, Ch'oe U commanded many private soldiers. Ch'oe U's soldiers practiced combat with flags and drums from Seonjukkyo to Sunginmun when the Khitans invaded, indicating his preparedness to maintain power.

Ch'oe U was regarded as one of the finest calligraphers in Korea of his time. Goryeo poet Yi Kyubo considered him one of the "Four Masters" alongside Kim Saeng (김생; 金生) of Silla, Tanyŏn (탄연; 坦然) and Yu Sin (유신; 柳伸) of Goryeo. King Huijong even requested Ch'oe U to write the screen texts for Seongyeongjeon and Daegwanjeon, where envoys from the Jin dynasty were received. This suggests that Ch'oe U had uncommon scholarly qualities among military rulers.

== Rise to Power ==
In 1219, Ch'oe Ch'unghŏn passed away. He had already designated his eldest son, Ch'oe U, as his successor. Near death, Ch'oe Ch'unghŏn secretly summoned Ch'oe U and warned him, "If my illness does not improve, trouble may arise in the family, so do not come again." Ch'oe U had his son-in-law, Kim Yaksŏn, care for his father while he stayed away to protect his inheritance.

Ch'oe Ch'unghŏn's intuition was correct. His four closest aides, Ch'oe Chunmun (최준문; 崔俊文), Chi Yunsim (지윤심; 池允深), Yu Songjŏl (유송절; 柳松節), and Kim Tŏngmyŏng (김덕명; 金德明), feared for their fate under Ch'oe U and wanted Ch'oe Hyang to succeed instead. They plotted to kill Ch'oe U when he visited his father, repeatedly sending for him. However, Ch'oe U, heeding his father's warning, did not appear. Kim Tŏngmyŏng eventually betrayed his co-conspirators, informing Ch'oe U, and the conspiracy failed. Ch'oe U exiled the other three conspirators and killed Ch'oe Chunmun during his exile.

A few days later, Ch'oe Ch'unghŏn died. Ch'oe U succeeded him, gaining control of Goryeo's government. He first presented the gold, silver, and precious items accumulated by his father to the king. He returned the lands and enslaved people seized by force to their original owners, garnering public support. He then systematically removed critical figures from his father's administration, including Kŭm Ŭi (금의; 琴儀), Chŏng Pangbo (정방보; 鄭邦輔), and Mun Yup'il (문유필; 文惟弼), under the pretext of eradicating corruption. Thus, Ch'oe U fully consolidated his power.

== Dictator ==
When Ch'oe U ascended to power in 1219, his official position was merely a vice commissioner of the Security Council (추밀원부사; 樞密院副使; ch'umirwŏnbusa). By the end of the following year, he had been promoted to Assistant Executive in Political Affairs (참지정사; 參知政事; ch'amjijŏngsa). He concurrently held third-rank positions in the Ministry of Personnel and the Ministry of War, as well as the superintendent of the Censorate (판어사대사; 判御史臺事; p'anŏsadaesa), which was responsible for the inspection of officials. Although he monopolized these critical positions, several officials were still above him in the Goryeo bureaucratic hierarchy. Remarkably, despite holding exclusive power for almost 30 years after that, these were his last official positions, signifying that his authority was established independently of the formal bureaucratic structure.

In 1221, he became assistant executive in political affairs, the minister of personnel and war (이병부상서; 吏兵部尙書; ibyŏngbusangsŏ), and superintendent of the Censorate, thereby solidifying his position as ruler. In preparation for the Mongol invasion, he ordered the construction of fortresses in strategic locations like Uiju (宜州, now Deokwon in South Hamgyong Province), Hwaju (和州, now Yeongheung in South Hamgyong Province), and Cheolgwan (鐵關, now Cheornyeong).

In 1223, he contributed over 300 ŭnbyŏng and 2,000 sŏk of rice, mobilized his private soldiers to repair the outer walls of Gaeseong, and created a 13-story pagoda and flower vases with 200 kŭn of gold, which he enshrined at Heungwangsa Temple (興王寺).

In 1225, he established the Personnel Authority (정방; 政房; chŏngbang) at his private residence to handle personnel matters of civil and military officials. In the Personnel Authority, personnel appointments were decided and written down in a register, which was then submitted to the king for approval. In 1227, he set up the Chamber of Scholarly Advisors (서방; 書房; sŏbang)() at his residence, where he enlisted renowned scholars to serve in three shifts. The Chamber of Scholarly Advisors and Tobang formed the dual pillars of the Ch'oe family's security apparatus. He inherited and expanded his father's Tobang, reorganizing it into the Inner and Outer Tobang. The Inner Tobang guarded Ch'oe U and his residence, while the Outer Tobang protected his relatives and external affairs. In 1228, he was bestowed the title of Odae Jingu Gongsin (鼇戴鎭國功臣).

In 1229 (the 16th year of King Gojong's reign), he forcibly confiscated over a hundred neighboring houses to create a significant polo ground. The field, several hundred steps long and as flat as a chessboard, continued to expand as he demolished more houses, eventually displacing hundreds of families. He often watched his Tobang and Mabyeolcho (馬別抄) play polo there for five to six days while hosting banquets for officials and elders. The Mabeolcho was a cavalry unit created by Ch'oe U that served as the Ch'oe family's private guards and ceremonial troops. Ch'oe U organized the Yabyeolcho (夜別抄) to patrol at night and suppress thieves. This Yabyeolcho later expanded and reorganized into the Sambyeolcho, which served as police and military units for the Ch'oe regime.

In 1231, upon the death of his wife, Lady Chŏng, her funeral followed the precedent set by Queen Sundeok, the consort of King Yejong. The king granted 70 bolts of silk and conducted her funeral with the honors befitting a queen. She was posthumously honored as Byeonhan Gukdaebuin (卞韓國大夫人) and given the posthumous title Gyeonghye (敬惠). The extravagance displayed by officials competing to offer lavish tributes caused a significant rise in market prices.

=== Mongol Invasions ===
In 1232, in response to the Mongol invasions, he fortified strategic locations and petitioned the king to move the capital to Ganghwa Island to resist the Mongols. He then moved his household goods and the Directorate-General for Policy Formulation (교정도감; 敎定都監; kyojŏngdogam) to Ganghwa using 100 carts and helped the people of Gaeseong flee to Ganghwa. He also relocated the people of various provinces to mountain fortresses and islands, ultimately persuading the king to relocate the capital.

In 1234 (the 21st year of King Gojong's reign), the king conferred the Marquis Jin Yang (晋陽侯) title for relocating the capital. He established a fief for him, building a private estate and planting pines and cypresses over several miles. Eight years later, in 1242 his title was elevated to Duke (公).

In 1243, he renovated the Kukchagam and donated 300 seok of rice to the Yanghyeongo (養賢庫) for scholarships. He also used his private funds to initiate the second carving of the Tripitaka Koreana after its destruction in Ganghwa, completed in 1251, two years after his death.

=== Succession ===
Ch'oe U had three primary wives, but none bore him sons. His two sons were born to his concubine, Seo Ryeonbang (瑞蓮房). Ch'oe U did not consider these sons suitable as successors. Instead, he planned to pass power to his son-in-law, Kim Yaksŏn. Fearing future power struggles, Ch'oe U ordained his two sons as monks: the first son became Manjong (萬宗) and the second, Manjeon (萬全). They were sent to Songgwangsa Temple (松廣寺) in Suncheon, and later, Manjeon moved to Ssangbongsa Temple (雙峰寺) in Hwasun, and Manjong to Dansoksa Temple (斷俗寺) in Sancheong. However, these brothers caused havoc in the Jeolla and Gyeongsang regions, using the temples as their bases.

Meanwhile, in Ganghwa, Kim Yaksŏn prospered politically, even marrying his daughter to the crown prince, the future king Wonjong. However, jealousy from his wife over his interactions with other women led to a complaint to her father, Ch'oe U, resulting in Kim Yaksŏn's elimination.

==== Summoning his sons ====
With no successor in sight, his two illegitimate sons' rampages in the south became a significant problem. Eventually, Ch'oe U, advised by Pak Hwŏn (박훤; 朴暄) and Song Kukch'ŏm (송국첨; 宋國瞻), confiscated his sons' ill-gotten wealth and imprisoned their followers.

In 1247, he summoned his sons to Ganghwa. During their reunion, they lamented their persecution, even while their father was alive, fearing worse after his death. Moved, Ch'oe U reinstated Ch'oe Manjŏn (최만전; 崔萬全), renaming him Ch'oe Hang (최항; 崔沆), and had him study the rites.

=== Death ===
In 1248, a year before his death, Ch'oe U strengthened Ch'oe Hang's position by appointing him as the Left and Right Guards Commander (左右衛上護軍) and Minister of Revenue and gave him 500 of his private soldiers. Ch'oe U died in November 1249 after 30 years in power.

== Evaluation ==
Ch'oe U was the first person to inherit the position of ruler within the Ch'oe military regime, approximately 50 years after its establishment. Unlike others who wielded power but lived in constant fear and rarely enjoyed their entire lifespan, Ch'oe U began his era on the solid foundation laid by his father, Ch'oe Ch'unghŏn. Consequently, the power and honor he enjoyed were no less than his father's.

Ch'oe U seemed to harbor ambitions for the throne. An astrologer, Chu Yŏnji (주연지; 周演之), discreetly told him that the current king was destined to lose the throne while Ch'oe U was destined to become king. Ch'oe U confided this prediction to his close aide Kim Hŭije (김희제; 金希磾) to gauge his reaction, but he became furious when it was met with indifference. Ch'oe U sometimes used his wealth for public works, such as repairing the outer walls of Gaegyeong or donating rice to the Yanghyeon Foundation (養賢庫). However, these expenses were minimal compared to his vast fortune.

The "History of Goryeo" (Goryeosa) contains many anecdotes illustrating Ch'oe U's immense power. For instance, once he suffered from severe leg swelling, everyone from high-ranking officials to lower-level clerks offered prayers and composed writings for his recovery, causing a paper shortage in the capital. Despite the efforts of many physicians, it was the wife of an official named Im Chŏng (임정; 林靖), who came from a family of doctors who successfully treated him with an herbal plaster. The king even granted Im Chŏng a government position to win Ch'oe U's favor.

=== Governance ===
Ch'oe U held the second rank post of Assistant Executive in Political Affairs only a year after seizing power. For almost the next 30 years, he did not assume any particular governmental positions.

During Ch'oe U's rule, internal and external instability led to the decline of official military forces, resulting in a rise in banditry. While the Tobang served as the Ch'oe's bodyguards, Ch'oe U gathered brave warriors to patrol nightly, which led to the formation of the Yabyeolcho (夜別抄). This group later split into the Left and Right Byeolcho and, along with the Shin'ui Army (神義軍), formed the Sambyeolcho (三別抄), which served as the military foundation for the Ch'oe regime.

While the military might be crucial during times of crisis, long-term stability requires more than force. The cooperation and support of the literati were essential. During Ch'oe U's reign, he established an organization to bind scholars close to the ruler, the Chamber of Scholarly Advisors, which was a group of literati established at Ch'oe U's residence, divided into three shifts to serve continuously.

The Ch'oe regime also derived power from monopolizing personnel appointments. They established the Personnel Authority in 1225 to manage this function. Although Personnel Authority was located at Ch'oe U's residence and functioned more like a private institution of the Ch'oe regime rather than an official state organ, it decided all official government post appointments. The king merely approved the lists submitted by Personnel Authority.

=== Extravagance ===
Despite his initial efforts to gain popular support, his later years were marked by tyranny and extravagance, leading to public resentment.

During the Mongol invasions and the subsequent relocation of the capital to Ganghwa Island, Ch'oe U seized over a hundred carts to transport officials' salaries. They used them to move his wealth first. Even in Ganghwa, his luxurious lifestyle remained unchanged. In 1245, he hosted a grand banquet in May during a brief respite from Mongol attacks. He constructed a high pavilion draped with silk and brocade curtains, where swings adorned with intricate patterns were hung. He decorated the area with giant ice sculptures shaped like mountains, surrounded by silver and mother-of-pearl decorations. Four large jars filled with peonies and ten other types of flowers, reflecting the ice and flowers' colors, created a dazzling display. The banquet, attended by over 1,350 people, showcased his wealth and power.

== Honors and Remembrance ==
Ch'oe U was honored as a loyalist for relocating the capital and was depicted in the Gongsindang (功臣堂) Hall of Merit. However, after the fall of the Ch'oe regime, his image was removed, and his worship in the royal ancestral shrine was abolished. His posthumous title was Gwangnyeol (匡烈).

Ch'oe U's titles were extensive, as recorded in the epitaph of his son and successor, Ch'oe Hang. He held 26 official titles, including Grand Master of the Palace with Golden Seal and Purple Ribbon (금자광록대부; 金紫光祿大夫; kŭmjagwangnoktaebu), acting grand preceptor (수태사; 守大師; sut'aesa), Kaebu ŭidong samsa (개부의동삼사; 開府儀同三司), secretariat director (중서령; 中書令; chungsŏryŏng), supreme pillar of state (상주국; 上柱國; sangjuguk), supreme general (상장군; 上將軍; sangjanggun), prime historiographer (감수국사; 監修國史; kamsuguksa), superintendent of the Censorate, Jin Yanggun Gaegukgong (晋陽郡開國公), and others. He was granted fiefs of 3,000 households and a food stipend for 1,000 families. He held the highest ranks in civil and military positions and received the posthumous title of Gwangyeolgong (匡烈公).

=== Legacy ===
King Gojong promptly appointed Ch'oe Hang to high offices similar to those initially held by his father and soon after made him special commissioner of the Directorate-General for Policy Formulation, formalizing his rule. Thus, the Ch'oe military regime continued into its third generation. Ch'oe Hang ruled for eight years, dying in 1257 at 49. Power then passed to his son Ch'oe Ŭi, born to a concubine. However, Ch'oe Ŭi's reign lasted less than a year before he was overthrown in a coup led by Yu Kyŏng (유경; 柳璥), Kim Chun, and Im Yŏn (임연; 林衍)) in March 1258, ending the Ch'oe military regime after four generations and 60 years.

== Family ==
- Father: Ch'oe Ch'unghŏn (1149 – 29 October 1219)
  - Grandfather: Ch'oe Wŏnho (최원호)
  - Grandmother: Lady Yu (부인 유씨)
- Mother: Lady Song (부인 송씨)
  - Grandfather: Song Ch'ŏng (송청)
- Wives and their issue(s):
  - Lady Chŏng, of the Hadong Chŏng clan (부인 하동 정씨; ? – 1231); daughter of Chŏng Sukch'ŏm (정숙첨).
    - Lady Ch'oe (부인 최씨); married Kim Yaksŏn
      - Grandson: Kim Mi (김미)
      - Grandson: Kim Wihang (김위항)
      - Grandson: Kim P'ilyŏng (김필영)
        - Great-granddaughter: Queen Jeongsun (정순왕후, 1222 – 29 July 1237)
    - Lady Ch'oe (부인 최씨)
  - Lady Tae, of the Hyeopgye Tae clan (부인 협계 대씨; ? – 1251); daughter of Tae Chipsŏng.
    - O Sŭngjŏk (오승적) – stepson died after being killed by Ch'oe Hang.
  - Lady Ch'oe, of the Cheorwon Ch'oe clan (부인 철원 최씨)
  - Lady Sŏ Ryŏnbang (서련방)
    - Ch'oe Manjong (최만종)
    - Ch'oe Hang (최항; 1209 – 17 May 1257)
  - Lady An Sim (안심)

== See also ==
- History of Korea
- List of Goryeo people

== Notes ==
Preceded by Ch'oe Ch'unghŏn	Military Leader of Goryeo; 1219–1249	Succeeded by Ch'oe Hang

Preceded by Ch'oe Ch'unghŏn	Leader of Ubong Ch'oe Military regime (House of Ch'oe); 1219–1249	Succeeded by Ch'oe Hang
