= Yi Kyubo =

Korean poet and bureaucrat (1168–1241)

- Hangul: 이규보
- Hanja: 李奎報
- RR: I Gyubo
- MR: I Kyubo

Yi Kyubo (Korean: 이규보; Hanja: 李奎報; 1168–1241) was a Korean literary critic and poet of the Koryo period. Approximately 1,500-2,000 of his poems and numerous prose works survive. The 13th century Collected Works of Minister Yi of Korea by Yi Kyubo is one of the earliest texts of a Korean writer commissioned by an official patron.

== Background ==
It is said that he was born in Yeoju, Gyeonggi Province in 1168. However, there are no accurate records, so it is difficult to be certain.

Yi Kyubo excelled in poetry and writing from an early age. From the age of nine, he studied all the literature of the Confucian Classics, and was a unique talent who could remember it after reading it once. He entered Munheon Gongdo, the best private school, and stood out among them. In particular, Yi Kyubo showed great talent in the Gakchok Busi, a poetry writing test.

In 1189 (the 19th year of King Myeongjong’s reign), he passed the preliminary examination, Sima Si (the Jinsa exam of the Joseon Dynasty), and the following year in 1190 (the 21st year of King Myeongjong’s reign), he took the main examination, Yebusi, and was selected as Dongjinsa (同進士) or first privy counselor of the ruling Ch'oe family. However, after his father died, he went to Cheonmasan in Kaeseong, called Baekungeosa, and lived there writing. There, he wrote “Cheonmasansi” and others, and in particular, the heroic epic “Dongmyeongwangpyeon” is an epic that sings of the life and footsteps of Dongmyeongwang, the national hero and founder of Goguryeo, and is considered a great achievement in the history of Korean literature.

In 1199 (the second year of King Sinjong’s reign), when a rebellion broke out in Donggyeong (Gyeongju), he volunteered to join the army and became a military officer.

Yi Kyubo was one of the most important literary critics of his time, concerned with form theory (yongsa ron) and creative theory (shunui ron). His views diverged from those of Yi Illo, who rejected the notion of the importance of individual creativity in poetry. Although both held similar views, Yi Illo was more conservative and placed a greater emphasis on Hanmun forms. value the use of an elegant or refined language.

== Influence of Chinese poets ==
Modern Korean scholars have attributed Chinese influence in Yi Kyubo's writing to Bai Juyi, Tao Yuanming and Su Dongpo. Bai Juyi was one of the most influential Tang dynasty writers, even more influential than Li Bai and Du Fu. Although the Middle Tang era was four centuries before Yi Kyubo's time, imitation of Middle Tang literature continued to be commonplace in the Song dynasty. Koryo envoys had acquired copies of two of the four major encyclopedic works compiled during the reign of the Song emperor Taizong, one of which was the Wenyuan yinghua (Finest Blossoms in the Garden of Literature). This work had intended to teach Song era writers how to compose poetry ad other literary works.

He wrote a poem about Tao Yuanming called Reading Tao Yuanming's Poems:

Tao Yuanming freed himself from official business:
he returned to the country,
to wander among pine, bamboo and chrysanthemum.
When he had no wine, he sought out a fried;
he fell down drunk every day.
On the sleeping bench he stretched his body out;
the breeze blew cool and refreshing.
From the bright ancient world he came,
a scholar noble and true.
I think of the man when I read the poems;
his integrity will be praised for a thousand years.

Yi Kyubo's works were heavily influenced by Su Dongpo, considered the greatest poet of the Northern Song of whom he wrote: "Dongpo was the greatest man of letters, towering over all others in modern times."

== Works ==
Yi Kyubo wrote prose works in the kajon genre, "fictitious" biographies first popularized by Han Yu in the Tang dynasty. Along his works in this genre are the Tale of the Turtle in Clear Water and The Story of Mr. Yeast.

The Lay of King Tongmyong may be Yi Kyubo's best known poem. The mythic tale of the founding of the Kingdom of Koguryo emphasized local Korean historical legends and cultural achievements. It is considered a nationalist rebuttal to Chinese-dominated historical traditions and Mongol political dominance.
