= Kim Chun =

Goryeo military ruler (r. 1258–1228)

Kim Chun 김준

Military Leader of Goryeo
- In office 1258–1268
- Monarchs: Gojong of Goryeo; Wonjong of Goryeo
- Preceded by: Choe Ui
- Succeeded by: Im Yŏn

Personal details
- Born: Unknown
- Died: 1268
- Spouse(s): Lady An Sim; Unnamed wife
- Children: Kim Dae-jae; Kim Yong-jae; Kim Seok-jae; Kim Ae; Kim Ki; Kim Chŏng
- Parent: Kim Yun-seong (father)

- Kim Chun
- Hangul: 김준
- Hanja: 金俊
- RR: Gim Jun
- MR: Kim Chun

Kim Chun (Korean: 김준; Hanja: 金俊; ? – 1268), also known as Kim In-kun, was the ninth military leader who ruled during the late period of the Goryeo military regime.

== Biography ==
Kim Chun was the son of Kim Yun-sŏng, a house slave of the powerful Choe family of Goryeo's military dictatorship. Kim Chun had a brother, Kim Sŭng-jun but later, he renamed himself Kim Ch'ung. Kim Chun was good at riding and archery. In 1258, Ch'oe Ŭi was overthrown and killed by Kim Chun and Yu Kyŏng (1211–1289). Kim Chun became the new military ruler and shortly after that, Goryeo concluded a war with Mongols.

However, Kim Chun's power was much weaker than those of his predecessors, because his regime was sustained by a small number of sympathizers who coincide with the coup d'état. Kim Chun continued to insist on the war with Mongols and in this context, he began to give power to his relatives in order to strengthen his power, led to corruption and resulted in violent clashes with a few supporters of the regime. Im Yeon, who was an adopted child of Kim Chun, had a problem with Kim Chung and his wealth.

The new king, Wonjong of Goryeo was an opponent of Kim Chun and scholars who had insisted on peace with Mongolia gained power. In 1268, Im Yeon assassinated Kim Chun and became the new military leader. The next year, Im Yeon's attempt to replace King Wonjong was reversed by the crown prince with the help from the Mongol force.

== Family ==
- Father: Kim Yun-sŏng (김윤성)
  - Brother: Kim Sŭng-jun (김승준), later renamed himself Kim Ch'ung (김충, d. 1268).
- Wives and their issue(s):
  - Lady An Sim (안심; 安心)
    - 1st son: Kim Tae-jae (김대재, 金大材; d. 1268)
    - 2nd son: Kim Yong-jae (김용재, 金用材; 1228–1268); later changed into Kim Ju (김주; 金主).
    - 3rd son: Kim Sŏk-jae (김석재, 金碩材; d. 1262)
  - Unnamed woman
    - Son: Kim Ae (김애, 金皚; d. 1268)
    - Son: Kim Ki (김기, 金棋; d. 1268)
    - Son: Kim Chŏng (김정, 金靖; d. 1268)

== In popular culture ==
- Portrayed by Kim Joo-hyuk in the 2012 MBC TV series God of War.

Preceded by Ch'oe Ŭi	Military Leader of Goryeo; 1258–1268	Succeeded by Im Yŏn
