= Ch'oe Ch'unghŏn =

Military ruler of Korea (1149–1219)

Ch'oe Ch'unghŏn 최충헌
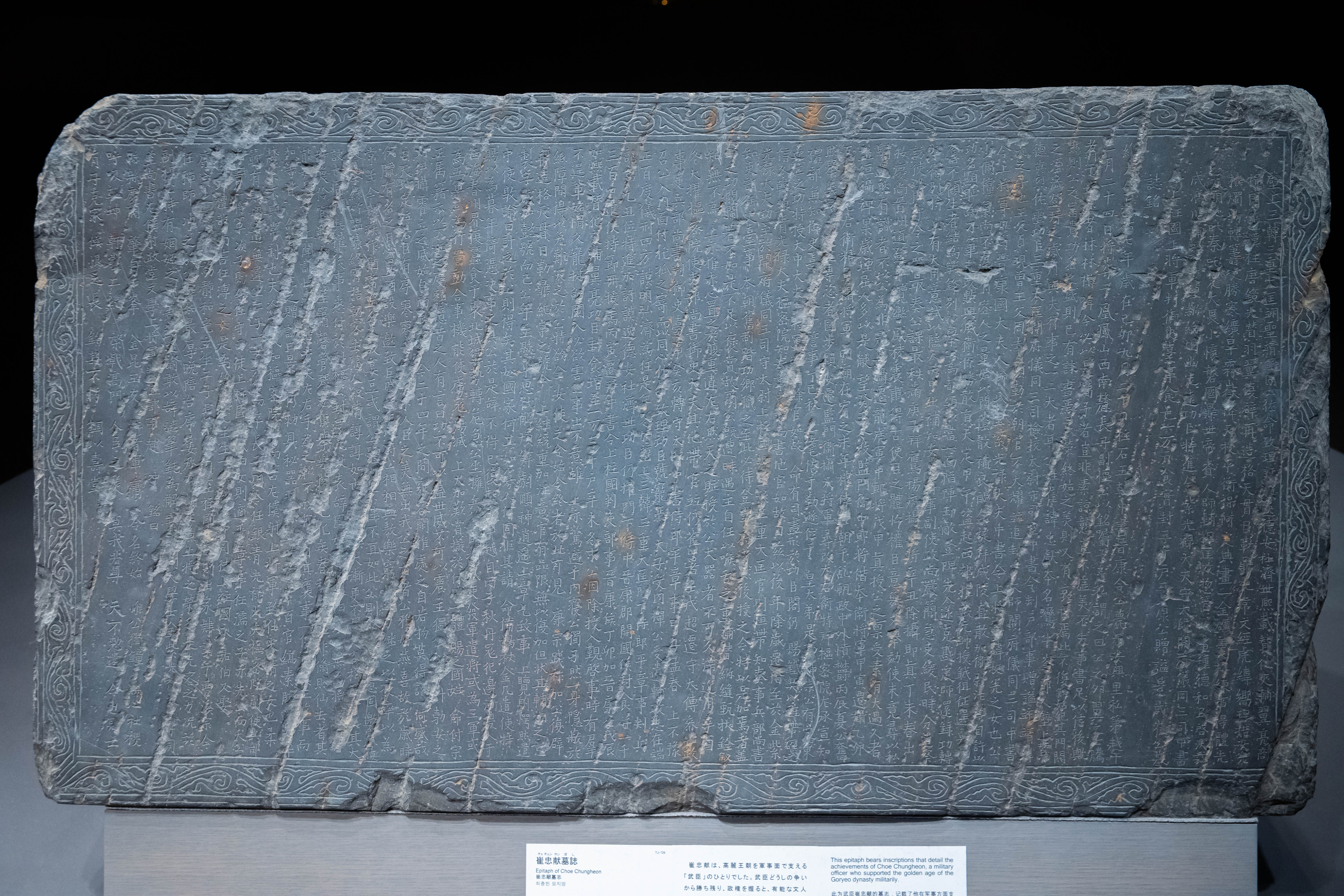
- Epitaph of Ch'oe Ch'unghŏn

Military Leader of Goryeo

Imperial Guardian
- In office 1196–1219
- Monarchs: Myeongjong of Goryeo; Sinjong of Goryeo; Huijong of Goryeo; Gangjong of Goryeo; Gojong of Goryeo
- Preceded by: Yi Ŭi-min
- Succeeded by: Ch'oe U

Personal details
- Born: 1149; Gaeseong or Gyeongju
- Died: 29 October 1219 (aged 70)
- Spouse(s): Lady Song; Princess Jeonghwa; Princess Suseong
- Children: Ch'oe U Ch'oe Hyang; Ch'oe Ku; Unnamed son Ch'oe Sŏng
- Parents: Ch'oe Wŏnho (father); Lady Yu (mother)

- Ch'oe Ch'unghŏn
- Hangul: 최충헌
- Hanja: 崔忠獻
- RR: Choe Chungheon
- MR: Ch'oe Ch'unghŏn

Ch'oe Ch'unghŏn (Korean: 최충헌; Hanja: 崔忠獻; 1149 – 29 October 1219) was a military ruler of Korea during the Goryeo period. After overthrowing the previous military ruler, Yi Ŭimin, Ch'oe consolidated his power through purges and presented reform measures known as 'Bongsa Sipjo' (封事十條). To maintain control, he created a dual administration, with private government institutions and private military forces answering directly to him, while maintaining the government structures of the old dynastic regime and limiting its authority. His power was so immense that he replaced four kings and established a power base that maintained the Ch'oe family's military regime for over 60 years.

== Early life ==
Ch'oe Ch'unghŏn was born in 1149, the son of Supreme General Ch'oe Wŏnho (최원호) and his wife, Lady Yu (유씨). He is thought to have been born in Gaeseong or Gyeongju. He was descended from the famous Confucian scholar Ch'oe Ch'iwŏn, who lived in the North South States Period and was the ancestor of the Gyeongju Ch'oe clan, but because Ch'oe Wŏnho was given the ancestral seat of Ubong, his family split from the Gyeongju Ch'oe clan and became the Ubong Ch'oe clan. He married Lady Song, the daughter of general Song Ch'ŏng, and had two sons by her, Ch'oe U and Ch'oe Hyang.

== Military career ==
Ch'oe entered the military, like his father, and was a colonel until he reached age 35 when he became a general. He joined the Council of Generals at age 40. Ch'oe served under the military dictators during the reign of King Myeongjong. During the rule of military dictator Yi Ŭimin, Ch'oe and his brother Ch'oe Ch'ungsu became dissatisfied with his reign. Initially, he became the yangonryŏng (良醞令) via protected appointment due to his father's status in the military. It was the first official position that Ch'oe Ch'unghŏn which was an 8th rank position in the Agency for Royal Liquors (양온서; 良醞署; Yangonsŏ), responsible for producing and supplying alcohol to the royal family and government offices. For a while, he moved between lower positions, but after the military coup occurred, he felt ashamed to remain in a clerical position despite his determination to achieve merit and make a name for himself, so he reportedly changed to a military position.

In 1174 (the 4th year of King Myeongjong's reign), he rose to prominence in the central political arena during Cho Wich'ong's (조위총; 趙位寵) rebellion. General Ki T'aksŏng (기탁성; 奇卓誠) selected Ch'oe and he made significant contributions at the forefront, leading to his promotion to the position of a commandant of the special patrol troops (별초도령; 別抄都令; pyŏlch'o toryŏng) and later to sŏp-changgun (섭장군; 攝將軍) upon his return. He subsequently held various positions in both central and local government.

During Yi Ŭimin's reign, he became the royal inspector of Gyeongsang Jinju Province but was impeached for going against the wishes of the powerful officials, which reportedly blocked his path for several years thereafter. It seems that the relationship with the governor Yi Ŭimin, who was likely from Gyeongju and had deep ties to the region, was not good. Ch'oe Ch'unghŏn, who was full of ambition, had not been able to seize the opportunity to realize his aspirations until he was in his late 40s.

== Coup d'état ==
In April 1196 (the 26th year of King Myungjong), when Ch'oe Ch'unghŏn turned 48, an opportunity finally came to him. The incident began in an unexpected place. His younger brother, Ch'oe Ch'ungsu, had his pet pigeon taken by Yi Chiyŏng, the son of Yi Ŭimin. Ch'oe Ch'ungsu, who had a fierce temperament, immediately went to Yi Chiyŏng's house and demanded the pigeon's return, but he was met with insults and returned humiliated and tied up instead. Ch'oe Ch'ungsu then went straight to his brother and expressed his intention to eliminate Yi Ŭimin and his three sons. At that time, it had been over ten years since Yi Ŭimin came to power, and his and his sons' tyranny was becoming more severe daily, causing them to lose the people's support. In particular, his two sons, Yi Chiyŏng and Yi Chigwang, were even worse, to the point that people referred to them as the "Double Knives" and hated them. After some hesitation, Ch'oe Ch'unghŏn ultimately agreed.

On April 9, 1196, the king was scheduled to visit the temple of Bojeisa near Gaegyeong. However, Yi Ŭimin did not follow the royal procession and went to his Mount Mita (彌陀山) in Hapcheon, Gyeongnam. Having obtained this information in advance, Ch'oe Ch'unghŏn and his brothers, along with his nephew Pak Chinjae (박진재; 朴晋材) and his relative No Sŏsung (노석숭; 盧碩崇), went there and beheaded Yi Ŭimin. Ch'oe Ch'unghŏn and his group immediately returned to Gaegyeong to convince General Paek Chonyu (백존유; 白存儒), a military officer in the capital, to support his cause. He then massacred or exiled numerous civil and military officials identified as Yi Ŭimin's followers and seized power.

To justify these actions, he reported to the king:

"The treacherous Yi Ŭimin committed the crime of regicide, oppressed and harmed the people, and even coveted the throne. We have long despised him and now, for the sake of the state, have defeated him. However, fearing the leak of our plans, we did not seek royal permission, for which we are gravely guilty."

— Ch'oe Ch'unghŏn

With the King's approval, Ch'oe led the government forces and defeated the armies of the Yi loyalists. They also killed or exiled dozens of highranking military officials who were considered potential threats, including Kwŏn Chŏlp'yŏng, Kwŏn Chun, Son Sŏk, Son Hongyun, Kil In, Yi Kyŏngyu, Kwŏn Yun, Yu Sambaek, Ch'oe Hyŏkyun, Chu Kwangmi, Kim Yusin, Kwŏn Yon, and many others.

As a military officer who had not participated in the previous army coup, Ch'oe Ch'unghŏn faced potential backlash from other military officials. To legitimize his rule, he and his brother Ch'oe Ch'ungsu submitted a reform proposal called the Bongsasipjo (封事十條), which included the following points:

1. The king should return to the main palace.
2. Reduce the number of unnecessary officials.
3. Correct land ownership issues.
4. Levy taxes fairly.
5. Prohibit tribute to the royal family.
6. Regulate monks and prohibit usury by the royal family.
7. Appoint honest local officials.
8. Prohibit the extravagance of officials and promote frugality.
9. Abolish temples except for essential ones.
10. Criticize flattery among officials and promote capable individuals.

The beginning of this reform proposal justified the assassination of Yi Ŭimin. Ch'oe Ch'unghŏn and his brother argued that they killed Yi Ŭimin for his crimes against the state and threats to the people. They consolidated power by eliminating the ruling military faction following the military coup.

Ch'oe Ch'unghŏn, who seized power, held positions such as the Left Minister of State (third rank), responsible for conveying the king's orders, and the Chief Inspector of Officials (fourth rank), responsible for overseeing the conduct of officials. It was not until the following year that he was appointed a worthy subject. Unlike other military rulers who immediately ascended to the highest offices and ranks upon seizing power, he maintained a cautious attitude.

== Rise to power ==
In 1197 (the 27th year of King Myeongjong's reign), Ch'oe Ch'unghŏn was granted the title of Chungseongjari Gongsin (忠誠佐理功臣), and his father was given the title Bonguichandeok Gongsin Su Taewi Munhasirang (奉議贊德功臣 守太尉 門下侍郞). Although the position he held was not high, the power was solely in the hands of Ch'oe Ch'unghŏn. The first scapegoat was King Myeongjong. It seems that Myeongjong did not actively support Ch'oe Ch'unghŏn when he staged a coup. This can be inferred from the fact that the Suchang Palace, where the king resided, became a stronghold for the anti-coup forces. As a result, Ch'oe Ch'unghŏn decided to depose Myeongjong in 1197, the year following the coup (27th year of Myeongjong's reign). There was no particular justification for this. According to Ch'oe Ch'ungsu, who discussed this matter, the following can be said.

The current king has been on the throne for 28 years and is old, growing weary of his duties. Moreover, the minor lords are always by the king's side, exploiting his grace and authority to disrupt the state affairs. The king, having favored these petty individuals, has recklessly bestowed gold and silk, leading to an empty treasury and an inability to govern the officials and the people. Additionally, Crown Prince Wang Su has kept palace maids close and has fathered nine sons, each of whom he sent to the minor lords to have their heads shaved and be made disciples. Furthermore, his character is foolish and weak, making him unfit to be the crown prince.

— Ch'oe Ch'ungsu

In September of that year, citing the king's failure to implement the Bongsasipjo and waste of state treasury, he confined the king to Changrak Palace (昌樂宮). The only justification was that the king was old and weary of his duties, yet without causing much controversy, they replaced a king who had reigned for nearly 30 years, which shows the power of Ch'oe Ch'unghŏn. At this time, Ch'oe Ch'unghŏn mobilized troops, dividing them into five groups and deploying them throughout the city of Gaegyeong. He exiled key officials of the court, such as Tu Kyŏngsŭng (두경승; 杜景升) and Yu Tŭgŭi (유득의; 柳得義), and deposed King Myungjong. He sent his subordinates into the palace to pressure the king, forcing him to come out alone and confining him in Changrak Palace. It is said that he also sent the crown prince and crown princess away on horseback to Ganghwa Island, braving the rain. Myeongjong died in 1202 (the 5th year of Sinjong), five years later.

Initially, Ch'oe Ch'ungsu argued for appointing Wang Chin, the 6th descendant of Hyeonjong and the Minister of State, as the next king because he favored Wang Chin's female servant. However, Ch'oe Ch'unghŏn wanted to make Wang Min, the son of Injong and the younger brother of Myeongjong, the king. The justification was to follow the precedent set by Uijong and Myeongjong, which involved passing the throne from brother to brother. Thus, Wang Min ascended to the throne, becoming Sinjong, the 20th king of Goryeo. He was 54 years old at the time of his accession. The king was nothing more than a puppet. He couldn't even freely choose the water he drank. There was a popular belief among the people that if the king drank from the water of the Dalaejeong (炟艾井), the eunuchs would seize power, so Ch'oe Ch'unghŏn went so far as to destroy that well and have the king drink from the well of Gwangmyeongsa (廣明寺).

Under King Sinjong, Ch'oe Ch'unghŏn was appointed Jeongguk Gongsin Samhan Daegwang Daejung Daebu Sangjanggun Juguk (靖國功臣 三韓大匡 大中大夫 上將軍 柱國), and his father received the title Yeongryeol U Seong Gongsin Samjung Daegwang Munhasijung (英烈佑聖功臣 三重大匡 門下侍中). This established the Ch'oe family's military rule.

== Dictator ==
Ch'oe Ch'unghŏn purged 50 close associates of the king, rose to various high-ranking positions, and in 1200 (the 3rd year of King Sinjong's reign), established a personal guard unit based on Kyŏng Taesŭng's bodyguards, the Tobang, consisting of influential men from both civil and military ranks. Ch'oe Ch'unghŏn started to reorganize the government, but Ch'ungsu unseated the Crown Princess and tried to marry his daughter to the Crown Prince. Ch'oe Ch'unghŏn immediately intervened, and a bloody struggle between the Ch'oe brothers ensued. In the end, Ch'ungsu lost and was beheaded by Ch'oe Ch'unghŏn's troops. Ch'oe Ch'unghŏn was said to have wept when he saw his brother's head and gave him a proper burial.

In 1201 (the 4th year of King Sinjong's reign), he became commissioner of the Security Council (추밀원사; 樞密院使; ch'umilwŏnsa), the minister of personnel and war (이병부상서; 吏兵部尙書; ibyŏngbu sangsŏ) and chief censor (어사대부; 御史大夫; ŏsadaebu). In 1202 (the 5th year of King Sinjong's reign), he took over civil and military personnel administration from his residence. Ch'oe established a government where he could work with ministers and military officials to stabilize his regime. He also appointed several relatives to high government positions to slowly expand his power. By 1203 (the 6th year of King Sinjong's reign), he was appointed to the offices of vice-director of the Secretariat (중서시랑평장사; 中書侍郎平章事; chungsŏ sirang p'yŏngjangsa), minister of personnel (이부상서; 吏部尙書; ibu sangsŏ), and junior preceptor of the crown prince (태자소사; 太子少師; t'aeja sosa).

In 1204 (the 7th year of King Sinjong's reign), King Sinjong fell ill 1204 after seven years of rule and secretly begged Ch'oe to preserve and not overthrow the kingdom. Ch'oe respected this last request from the king and the next day, Ch'oe Ch'unghŏn secretly discussed and handled this issue with Ch'oe Sŏn and Ki Hongsu at his residence. The succession of the throne was also decided by Ch'oe Ch'unghŏn. Thus, Huijong ascended to the throne. At the end of the Sinjong section in the "History of Goryeo," the envoy commented on his reign as follows.

Sinjong was a king established by Ch'oe Ch'unghŏn. The power to save and kill people, to create and abolish official positions, all came from his hands. The king merely had an empty shell and was like a puppet over the subjects. How sad it is."

— History of Goryeo

Ch'oe gave the throne to Sinjong's son, who became King Huijong. Sinjong died of disease immediately after that he deposed King Sinjong and installed King Huijong, becoming Byeoksang Samhan Samjung Daegwang Gaebu I Dong Samsa Su Taesa Munhasirang Dong Jungseo Munha Pyeongjangsa Sangjanggun Sangjuguk Panbyeongbu Eosadaesa Taesasa (壁上三韓三重大匡 開府儀同三司 守太師 門下侍郎同中書門下平章事 上將軍 上柱國 判兵部御史臺事 太子太師). The king treated him with particular respect, calling him Eunmun Sangguk (恩門相國).

In 1205 (the 1st year of King Huijong's reign), Ch'oe Ch'unghŏn was granted 100 plots of land, the title Teukjin Humoe Il Deok Ansa Jese Gongsin (特進 訏謀 逸德 安社 濟世 功臣), and the office of Chancellor (Munhasijung (門下侍中)). He was given the title Jinganggun Gaegukhui (晋康郡 開國侯) with 3,000 households and 300 practical plots. The following year, he became Jinganghu (晋康侯) and established Heungnyeongbu (興寧府). Huijong was determined to retrieve all the former powers that military dictators and usurpers had taken from the kings, including by removing Ch'oe. Ch'oe had been given the State and Royal Protector rank, with power equivalent to the kings.

In 1207 (the 3rd year of King Huijong's reign), he was given the title Jinganggong (晋康公). Simultaneously, Ch'oe appointed Yi Kyubo to revive the declining literary fortune.

=== Rebellions ===
In 1207, Pak Chinjae rebelled against his uncle, but Ch'oe crushed him, exiled Pak Chinjae to Baekryeongjin (白翎鎭), and banished many of Pak's followers for rebelling against him.

There was resistance centered around Gyeongju, which was significant as it was a Silla restoration movement that outright denied the legitimacy of the dynasty. This movement shocked the ruling military factions and the general ruling class and posed a substantial obstacle to Ch'oe Ch'unghŏn's regime. Therefore, following a harsh suppression of the Gyeongju area, they established an even stronger control structure than the previous military regimes. As a result, local resistance gradually diminished during King Huijong's reign.

This was followed by a slave rebellion, led by one of Ch'oe's slaves, Manjeok. The enslaved people killed their masters and gathered on a mountain, around 100 strong. This rebel army was quickly terminated, and the bodies of the dead were thrown into a river, unburied. More rebellions occurred, including by Buddhist priests. Ch'oe was not able to completely silence the Buddhists, but he did capture the individual Buddhists who were behind a plot to assassinate him.

=== Assassination Attempts and Consolidation ===
In 1209 (the 5th year of King Huijong's reign), an assassination attempt by three clerks at Cheonggyo Station (靑郊驛) was uncovered. Ch'oe Ch'unghŏn established the Directorate-General for Policy Formulation (교정도감; 敎定都監; kyojŏng togam) at Yeongeungwan (迎恩館) to investigate and eliminate the conspirators. This office later became the highest authority under the Ch'oe regime gathering information and expanded its role to encompass all national affairs such as controlling personnel, inspections, and taxation, with Ch'oe Ch'unghŏn as its head with the office of special commissioner for policy formulation (교정도감; 敎定都監; kyojŏng pyŏlgam). Especially after the capital moved to Ganghwa Island during the Mongol invasions during the tenure of Ch'oe's son, the Directorate-General became central to national administration, including tax collection.

In 1211 (the 7th year of King Huijong's reign), he narrowly escaped death due to a plot by palace official Wang Chunmyŏng (왕준명; 王濬明), thanks to his guards. He deposed King Huijong and exiled him to Ganghwa Island, installing King Gangjong.

In 1212 (the 1st year of King Gangjong's reign), he renamed Heungnyeongbu to Jingangbu (晋康府) and was honored as Mungyeong Muwi Hyangri Jo an Gongsin (文經 武緯 嚮里措安功臣). In 1213, Gangjong died and Ch'oe installed Gojong. In 1214 (the 1st year of King Gojong's reign), Ch'oe Ch'unghŏn's wife, Lady Im, became Suseongtaekju (綬成宅主), and Lady Wang became Jeonghwataekju (靜和宅主).

To firmly maintain his regime, Ch'oe Ch'unghŏn reorganized the ruling apparatus, expanding private ruling bodies such as the Directorate-General for Policy Formulation, Tobang, and private soldiers. These organizations prioritized the prosperity of Ch'oe Ch'unghŏn's regime over maintaining state power. As Ch'oe Ch'unghŏn undermined the existing bureaucratic system to establish a framework for his one-person dictatorship, he required substantial human and material resources. After 1216 (the 3rd year of King Gojong's reign), the economic impoverishment that had accumulated until then led to a resurgence of local resistance, triggered by the invasion of the Khitan remnants.

=== Khitan Invasion ===
During this time, various northern tribes, including the Khitans, were being driven from their homelands by the invading Mongols. Many escaped to Goryeo, and violence flared along the northern border. Ch'oe's sons, U and Hyang, led separate campaigns in response. Hyang defeated the minor tribal armies to the east, and U defeated those in the west with the help of General Kim Ch'wiryŏ (김취려; 金就礪). Small contingents of the Mongols aided these victories.

In 1218 (the 5th year of King Gojong's reign), at 70, he was granted a staff. In 1219 (the 6th year of King Gojong's reign), King Gojong gave him the surname Wang (王).

=== Succession ===
Ch'oe witnessed the downfall of Chŏng Chungbu's regime, partially caused by the lack of a strong legitimate heir. Ch'oe's first son, Ch'oe U, was an influential strategist, soldier, and leader. The second son, Ch'oe Hyang, was an exceptional soldier but not a good negotiator or statesman.

Knowing a succession fight would ensue, Ch'oe forbade U to enter the house. Hyang attempted to kill his brother to cement his position as a successor. U and Hyang fought a sword battle, which U won. U did not kill his brother as his father had done to Ch'ungsu. Instead, he left his younger brother's fate in his father's hands.

Ch'oe Ch'unghŏn was pleased by U's decision and sent his younger son into exile. Ch'oe announced that he would be succeeded by his son, U, and that he would retire. He was around 65 when he made this announcement, and U was probably in his mid-thirties.

== Death and Legacy ==
Ch'oe lived peacefully for the remaining seven years of his life and even got to see his grandson Hang, son of U. Ch'oe, who survived several attempts on his life. He suffered a stroke and lived for one more year before he died at the age of 71 on 29 October 1219. It is recorded that his funeral was like that of a king's.

What was different from former military leaders was the active involvement of scholars in Ch'oe's control, notably Prime Minister Yi Kyubo, who was a Confucian scholar-official. After Sinjong died, Ch'oe forced his son to the throne as Huijong. After seven years, Huijong led a revolt but failed. Then, Ch'oe found the pliable King Gojong instead. Although the House of Ch'oe established strong private individuals loyal to it, continuous invasion by the Mongols ravaged the whole land, resulting in a weakened defense ability, and the power of the military regime waned.

Ch'oe Ch'unghŏn seized power by eliminating Yi Ŭimin and his faction due to the political instability during King Myeongjong's reign and the resistance from local societies, which created a conducive social atmosphere. To renew this social atmosphere, Ch'oe Ch'unghŏn presented the "Ten Reform Proposals" (Bongsasipjo). Internally, he aimed to stabilize the regime by dispelling the frequent political upheavals and the alliances and divisions among military factions under King Myeongjong. Externally, his goal was to quell the unrest in local societies. However, Ch'oe Ch'unghŏn's regime was essentially a continuation of the previous military regimes, showcasing the characteristics of a new oppressor.

Ch'oe Ch'unghŏn was the first of the Ch'oe dictators, and he set up the system of rule that the later Ch'oe dictators would use after Ch'oe Ch'unghŏn was his first son Ch'oe U, who led the armies of Goryeo to fight the Mongol armies. After Ch'oe U came to his first son Ch'oe Hang, who forced the king to reject all offers of surrender that the Mongols offered. When Ch'oe Hang died, his only son Ch'oe Ŭi came to power.

The primary support for the Ch'oe family's power was their military strength. They commanded a large private army that far surpassed the official government forces. This army, known as the Tobang, was said to stretch for two to three ri (about 0.8 to 1.2 kilometers) when assembled. The Dobang was originally a guard unit created by Kyŏng Taesŭng. He gathered hundreds of elite soldiers, housed and trained them at his residence, and always kept them by his side, even sharing the same blankets to show his sincerity. After Kyŏng Taesŭng's death, his Dobang forces were thoroughly eradicated. However, the Ch'oe family revived the concept of maintaining a private army at their residence, also called Gobang, which always protected the ruling family.

The Ch'oe regime lasted 60 years, during which Goryeo could resist the Mongol invasions. After the fall of the Ch'oe military regime, the Sambyeolcho, which was the private army of the Ch'oe family, separated from the Goryeo government and attempted to start its nation, but this rebellion was defeated by a Mongol-Goryeo army.

Approximately 845 Koreans today are members of the Ubong Ch'oe clan.

== Family ==
- Father: Ch'oe Wŏnho (최원호)
- Mother: Lady Yu (부인 유씨)
  - Brother: Ch'oe Ch'ungsu (최충수; 1151–1197)
  - Sister: Lady Ch'oe (부인 최씨)
    - Nephew: Pak Chinjae (박진재; 1165–1207)
- Wives and their issue(s):
  - Lady Song (부인 송씨); daughter of Song Ch'ŏng (송청)
    - Ch'oe U (1166 – 10 December 1249), first son
    - Ch'oe Hyang (1167–1230), second son
    - Lady Ch'oe (부인 최씨), first daughter
  - Princess Jeonghwa of the Kaesong Wang clan, daughter of King Gangjong of Goryeo.
    - Ch'oe Ku (최구), third son
    - Mr. Ch'oe (최씨), fourth son
  - Princess Suseong of the Jangheung Im clan (수성택주 임씨); daughter of Im Pu (임부).
    - Ch'oe Sŏng (최성), fifth son
  - Cha Unsŏn (자운선)

== Title ==
- Early title: 別抄都令 -> 攝將軍
- 1196: The title of 左承宣 御史臺知事 was added.
- 1197: The title of 靖國功臣 三韓大匡大中大夫 上將軍柱國 was added.
- 1204: The title of 壁上三韓三重大匡 開府儀同三司守太師 門下侍郞同中書門下平章事 上將軍上柱國 兵部御史臺判事 太子太師 was added. Just a few days later 晋康郡候 門下侍中 was additionally added.
- 1212: The title of 晋康府候 文經武緯嚮理措安功臣 was added.

== Popular culture ==
- Portrayed by Kim Kap-soo and Ryu Deok-hwan in the 2003–2004 KBS1 TV series Age of Warriors.
- Portrayed by Joo Hyun in the 2012 MBC TV series God of War.

== See also ==
- History of Korea
- List of Goryeo people

Political offices
Preceded by Yi Ŭi-min	Military Leader of Goryeo; 1197 – 1219	Succeeded by Ch'oe U
Regnal titles
New title	Marquis of Jingang; 1204 – 1219	Vacant
