= Kim Sŏng-han =

Silla nobleman (fl. 1st century)

- Hangul: 태조 성한왕
- Hanja: 太祖星漢王
- Revised Romanization: Taejo Seonghan wang
- McCune–Reischauer: T'aejo Sŏnghan wang

Birth name
- Hangul: 김성한, 김세한, 열한
- Hanja: 金星漢, 金勢漢, 熱漢
- Revised Romanization: Gim Seonghan, Gim Sehan, Yeolhan
- McCune–Reischauer: Kim Sŏnghan, Kim Sehan, Yŏrhan

Kim Sŏng-han (Korean: 김성한; Hanja: 金星漢), also called Kim Se-han (김세한; 金勢漢), was a Korean Silla dynasty politician. He was one of the founders of Gyeongju Kim clan. According to some theories, he was a son of Kim Al-chi, or a seventh-generation descendant of Xiongnu through the Han dynasty general Jin Midi. He was also known posthumously as King Taejo Seonghan (태조성한왕; 太祖星漢王).

== See also ==
- Hyeokgeose of Silla
- Talhae of Silla
- Suro of Geumgwan Gaya

== Site web ==
- [한마당―김상온] 新羅의 뿌리 국민일보 2004.12.13 (in Korean)
- (채널돋보기) 신라 김씨 왕족은 흉노의 후손일까 매일신문 2008.11.21 (in Korean)
- 경주 사천왕사(寺) 사천왕상(四天王像) 왜 4개가 아니라 3개일까 조선일보 2009.02.27 (in Korean)
- [김성회의 뿌리를 찾아서] <6> 김씨의 기원 세계일보 2011.04.02 (in Korean)
- 문무왕릉비 사실상 다 찾은 셈 경향신문 2009.09.03 (in Korean)
