= Moaksan =

Mountain in South Korea

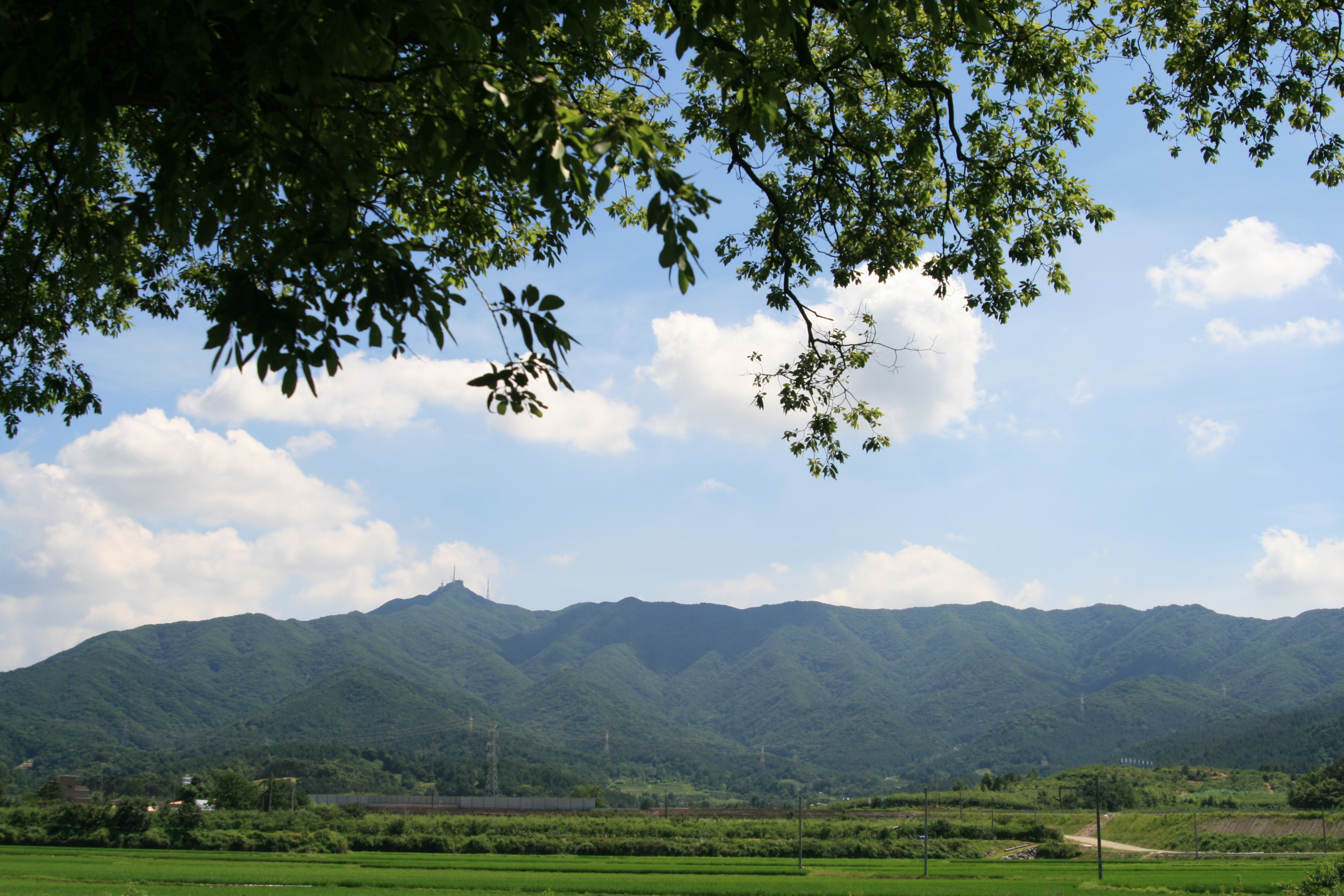

Highest point
- Elevation: 793 m (2,602 ft)
- Listing: Mountains of Korea
- Coordinates: 35°43′45″N 127°05′07″E

Geography
- Country: South Korea
- Region: North Jeolla Province

Korean name
- Hangul: 모악산
- Hanja: 母岳山
- RR: Moaksan
- MR: Moaksan

Moaksan is a mountain of North Jeolla Province, western South Korea. It has an elevation of 793 metres. The mountain is famed for the Geumsansa standing on the slope of the mountain.
