= Military of Goryeo =

- 고려군
- Royal flag
- Founded: 918
- Disbanded: 1392
- Service branches: Imperial/Royal Guard; Army; Navy; Provincial Army and Militias

Leadership
- Commander-in-Chief: King/Emperor of Goryeo
- Goryeo Military Regime (1170–1270): Military Dictator

Personnel
- Military age: 16–60
- Active personnel: 236,237

Related articles
- History: Korean–Jurchen border conflicts; Goryeo–Khitan War; Mongol Invasions of Korea; Sambyeolcho Rebellion; Red Turban invasions of Goryeo; Wihwado Retreat

The military of Goryeo was the primary military force of the Goryeo dynasty. During the Later Three Kingdoms period, Wang Kŏn overthrew the Taebong ruler, Kung Ye, and renamed it Goryeo after the Goguryeo dynasty. He led the kingdom's armies and navies against Silla and Later Baekje and unified the peninsula. Goryeo was able to mobilize sizable military might during times of war.

In the early period, the army was known for successfully defending the northern borders from the Khitans and the Jurchens. But the Imperial Court and the official scholars mistreated the military and overthrew the emperor, establishing a military regime that lasted a century. In the middle period, the army was also known for repelling the Mongol Empire until they capitulated after the ninth invasion, reducing the emperor to the status of king. The military regime opposed Mongol rule until the royal court overthrew them under their direction. The Sambyeolcho Army revolted against the Mongols in response until they suppressed them.

The navy was known for aiding the Mongols in invading Japan, but the Japanese defeated them, leaving the south defenseless against Wokou Pirate raids. The navy innovated gunpowder weaponry after the Mongol's use in the invasion of Japan to retrofit their ships with cannons and rockets to strengthen their naval defenses.

During the late period, King Gongmin purged Goryeo of Mongol influence and regained their sovereignty. They invaded the north, retaking some of Goguryeo's territories south of Manchuria. However, they lost them during the Red Turban Invasion of Goryeo but repelled them. However, the wars brought Goryeo to ruin. General Yi Sŏng-gye, who was ordered to attack the Ming to regain Liaodong retreated from Wihwado and overthrew the Goryeo and established the Joseon dynasty.

== History ==
=== Later Three Kingdoms period and the War for Unification ===
From 889 to 935 AD, the Unified Shilla began to decline from corruption and internal strife, which led to the revival of Later Baekje and Later Goguryeo. A monk named Kung Ye founded Hugoguryeo but changed the names to Majin and Taebong in later years. Taejo's father, Wang Yung (later posthumously given the temple name of Sejo of Goryeo), along with many local clans, quickly surrendered to Kung Ye. Wang Kŏn followed his father into service under Kung Ye, the future leader of Taebong, and he began his service under Kung Ye's command.

In 900, he led a successful campaign against local clans and the army of Later Baekje in the Chungju area, gaining more fame and recognition from the king. In 903, he led a famous naval campaign against the southwestern coastline of Later Baekje (Keumsung, later Naju) while Kyŏn Hwŏn was at war against Silla. He led several more military campaigns and helped conquered people living in poverty under Silla's rule. The public favored him due to his leadership and generosity. He also led Taebong's Navy, took Geumseong from the Later Baekje, renamed it Naju, and stationed the troops in 903. In 909, Wang Kon became Admiral of the Navy and led the naval forces. Kyŏn Hwŏn captured the envoy's ship from Yeomhae County within the jurisdiction of Gwangju. That year, Wang Kon captured Jindo and Koido (皐夷島) of the Later Baekje with 2,500 soldiers. The following year, when Kyŏn Hwŏn threatened Naju again, Wang Kŏn defeated Kyŏn Hwŏn's naval forces at the Naju port, and arrived at the port of Bannamhyeon (潘南縣), captured the pirate leader Neungchang, and sent it to Gungye to behead him. This would be Wang Kon's naval military activity before the founding of Goryeo and, at the same time, Taebong's maritime activity.

However, Kung Ye began to refer to himself as the Buddha and persecuted people who expressed their opposition to his religious arguments. He executed many monks, then later, even his wife and two sons, and the public began to turn away from him. His costly rituals and harsh rule caused even more opposition. In 918, four of his generals—Hong Yu, Pae Hyŏn-gyŏng, Sin Sung-gyŏm and Pok Chigyŏm—overthrew Taebong and installed Wang Kon as King Taejo.

In 927, Kyŏn Hwŏn of Later Baekje led forces into Silla's capital, Gyeongju, capturing and executing its king, King Gyeongae. Then he established King Gyeongsun as his puppet monarch before he turned his army toward Goryeo. Hearing of the news, Taejo planned a strike with 5,000 cavalrymen to attack Kyŏn's troops on the way back home at Gongsan near Daegu. He met Later Baekje forces and suffered a disastrous defeat, losing most of his army, including his generals Kim Nak and Sin Sung-gyŏm, the very same man who crowned Wang as a king. However, Goryeo quickly recovered from defeat and successfully defended Later Baekje's attack on its front.

In 935, the last king of Silla, King Gyeongsun, felt there was no way to revive his kingdom and surrendered his entire land to Taejo. Taejo gladly accepted his surrender and gave him the title of prince, and accepted his daughter as one of his wives (Wang had six queens and many more wives as he married daughters of every single local leader). It caused much disgust to Kyŏn Hwŏn. Kyŏn's father, who held his claim to the Sangju region, also defected and surrendered to Goryeo and was received as the father of a king. Kyŏn Hwŏn's oldest son, Kyŏn Sin-gŏm, led a coup with his brothers Yang-gŏm and Yong-gŏm, against their father, who favored their half-brother, Kŭm-gang, as his successor to the throne. Kyŏn Hwŏn was sent into exile and imprisoned in Geumsansa but escaped to Goryeo and was treated like Taejo's father, who died just before his surrender.

In 936, Wang led his final campaign against Kyŏn Sin-gŏm of Later Baekje. Kyŏn Sin-gŏm fought against Taejo, but facing many disadvantages and inner conflict, he surrendered to Taejo. Wang finally occupied Later Baekje formally and unified the nation for the second time since Unified Silla; he ruled until 943.

=== Goryeo–Khitan War ===
Taejo displayed intense animosity toward the Khitans who had destroyed Balhae. The Liao dynasty sent 30 envoys with 50 camels as a gift in 942, but Wang Kŏn exiled the envoys and starved the camels under a bridge in retribution for Balhae, despite the major diplomatic repercussions. Taejo proposed to Gaozu of Later Jìn that they attack the Khitans as revenge for the destruction of Balhae, according to the Zizhi Tongjian. Furthermore, in his Ten Injunctions to his descendants, he stated that the Khitans are no different from beasts and should be guarded against.

The "Manbu Bridge Incident" of 942 forced Goryeo to prepare itself for a conflict with the Khitan Empire: Jeongjong established a military reserve force of 300,000 soldiers called the "Resplendent Army" in 947, and Gwangjong built fortresses north of the Chongchon River, expanding toward the Yalu River. The Khitans considered Goryeo a potential threat and, with tensions rising, invaded in 993. The Koreans were defeated in their first encounter with the Khitans, but successfully defended against them at the Chongchon River. Negotiations began between the Goryeo commander, Sŏ Hŭi, and the Liao commander, Xiao Sunning. In conclusion, Goryeo entered a nominal tributary relationship with Liao, severing relations with Song, and Liao conceded the land east of the Yalu River to Goryeo. Afterward, Goryeo established the "Six Garrison Settlements East of the River" in its new territory. In 994, Goryeo proposed to Song a joint military attack on Liao, but was declined; previously, in 985, when Song had proposed a joint military attack on Liao, Goryeo had declined. For a time, Goryeo and Liao enjoyed an amicable relationship. In 996, Seongjong married a Liao princess.

As the Khitan Empire expanded and became more powerful, it demanded that Goryeo cede the Six Garrison Settlements, but Goryeo refused. In 1009, Kang Cho staged a coup d'état, assassinating Mokjong and installing Hyeonjong on the throne. In the following year, under the pretext of avenging Mokjong, Emperor Shengzong of Liao led an invasion of Goryeo with an army of 400,000 soldiers. Meanwhile, Goryeo tried to establish relations with Song but was ignored, as Song had agreed to the Chanyuan Treaty in 1005. Goryeo won the first battle against Liao, led by Yang Kyu, but lost the second battle, led by Kang Cho: the Goryeo army suffered heavy casualties and was dispersed, and many commanders were captured or killed, including Kang Cho himself. Later, Pyongyang was successfully defended, but the Liao army marched toward Kaesong. Hyeonjong, upon the advice of Kang Kam-ch'an, evacuated south to Naju, and shortly afterward Kaesong was attacked and sacked by the Liao army. He then sent Ha Kong-jin and Go Yeong-gi to sue for peace, with a promise that he would pay homage in person to the Liao emperor, and the Khitans, who were sustaining attacks by the regrouped Korean army and disrupted supply lines, accepted and began their withdrawal. However, the Khitans were ceaselessly attacked during their withdrawal; Yang Kyu rescued 30,000 prisoners of war, but died in battle. According to the History of Liao, the Khitans were beset by heavy rains and discarded much of their armor and weapons. According to the Goryeosa, the Khitans were attacked while crossing the Yalu River and many drowned. Afterward, Hyeonjong did not fulfill his promise to pay homage in person to the Liao emperor, and when demanded to cede the Six Garrison Settlements, he refused.

The Khitans built a bridge across the Yalu River in 1014 and attacked in 1015, 1016, and 1017: victory went to the Koreans in 1015, the Khitans in 1016, and the Koreans in 1017. In 1018, Liao launched an invasion led by Xiao Paiya, the older brother of Xiao Sunning, with an army of 100,000 soldiers. The Liao army was immediately ambushed and suffered heavy casualties: the Goryeo commander Kang Kam-ch'an had dammed a large tributary of the Yalu River and released the water on the unsuspecting Khitan soldiers, who were then charged by 12,000 elite cavalry. The Liao army pushed on toward Kaesong under constant enemy harassment, but shortly turned around and retreated after failing to take the well-defended capital. The retreating Liao army was intercepted by Kang Kam-ch'an in modern-day Kusong and suffered a major defeat, with only a few thousand soldiers escaping. Shengzong intended to invade again but faced internal opposition. In 1020, Goryeo sent tribute and Liao accepted, thus resuming nominal tributary relations. Shengzong did not demand that Hyeonjong pay homage in person or cede the Six Garrison Settlements. The only terms were a "declaration of vassalage" and the release of a detained Liao envoy. The History of Liao claims that Hyeonjong "surrendered" and Shengzong "pardoned" him, but according to Hans Bielenstein, "[s]horn of its dynastic language, this means no more than that the two states concluded peace as equal partners (formalized in 1022)". Hyeonjong kept his reign title and maintained diplomatic relations with the Song dynasty. Kaesong was rebuilt, grander than before, and, from 1033 to 1044, the Cheolli Jangseong, a wall stretching from the mouth of the Yalu River to the east coast of the Korean Peninsula, was built for defense against future invasions. Liao never invaded Goryeo again.

=== Goryeo-Jurchen War ===
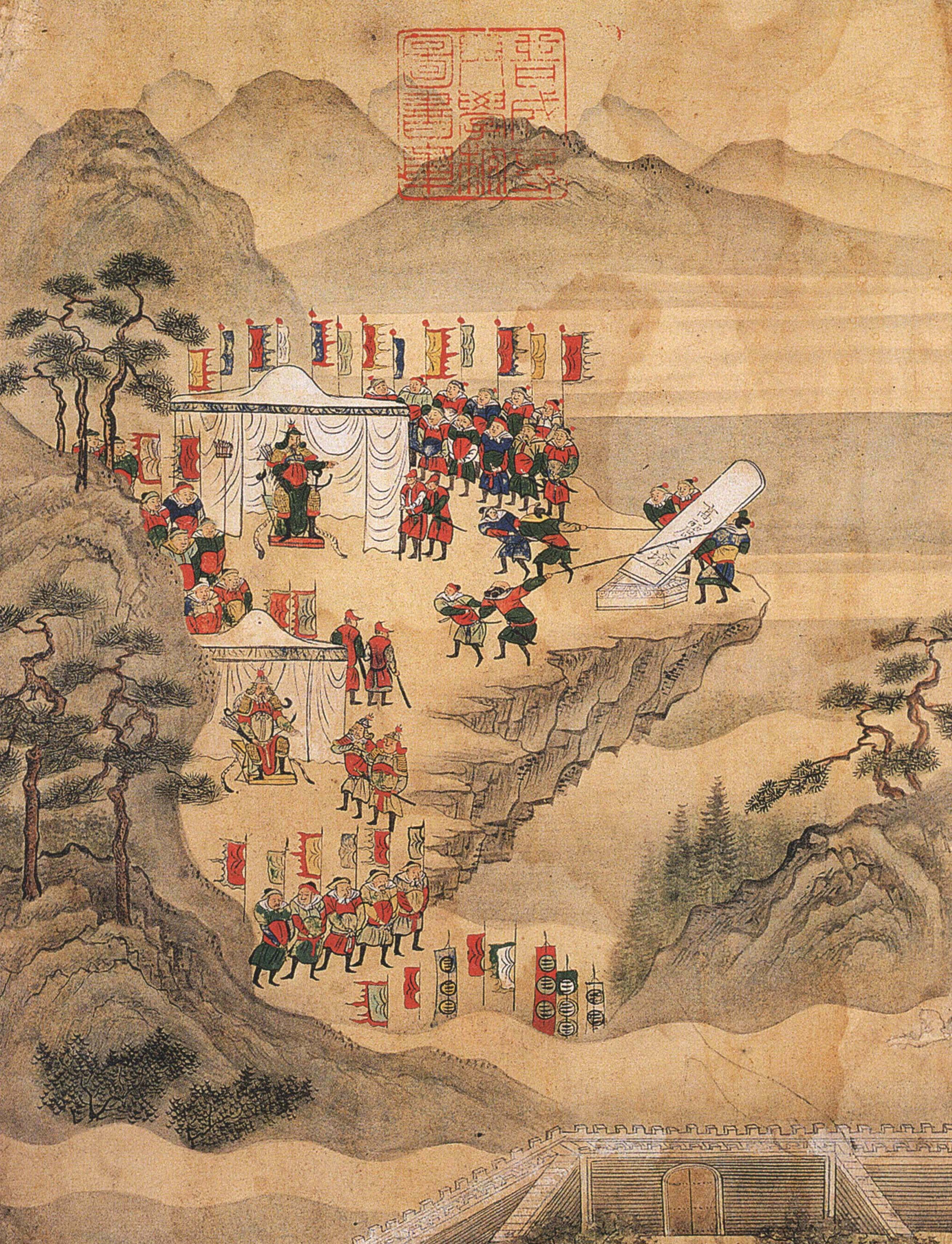
General Yun Kwan (1040–1111) and his army.

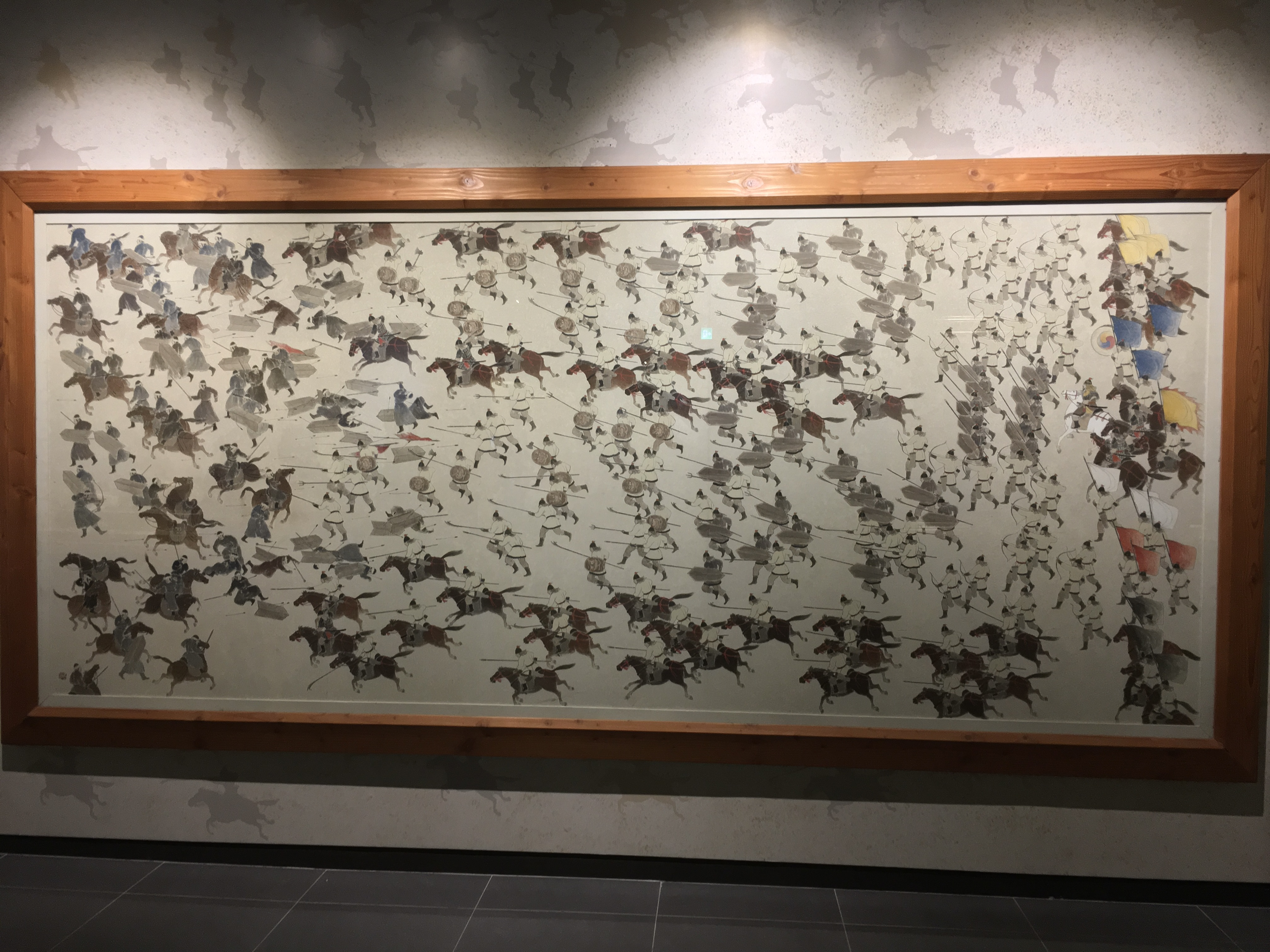
Byeolmuban routing the Jurchens.

The Jurchens in the Yalu River region were tributaries of Goryeo since the reign of Wang Kŏn, who called upon them during the wars of the Later Three Kingdoms period, but the Jurchens switched allegiance between Liao and Goryeo multiple times, taking advantage of the tension between the two nations; posing a potential threat to Goryeo's border security, the Jurchens offered tribute to the Goryeo court, expecting lavish gifts in return. The Jurchens north of Goryeo had traditionally rendered tribute to the Goryeo monarchs and called Goryeo their "parent country" considering past ties between Goguryeo and its Mohe subjects, but thanks to the defeat of Liao to the Koreans in 1019, the Wanyan tribe of the Heishui Mohe unified the Jurchen tribes and gained in might, taking advantage of the power vacuum.

At the peak of its power, Goryeo contested with the rising Wanyan tribes of which Goryeo considered them as barbaric vassals descending from the Mohe people that served their Goguryeo ancestors, in the state of total war over former territories of Goguryeo and Balhae.

As the geopolitical situation began to shift in turbulence by the start of the 12th century, Goryeo unleashed two major military campaigns from 1104 to 1109 spearheaded by the ambitious King Yejong with vows of reclaiming former Goguryeo territories held by Jurchen tribes united under the progenitors of the Jin dynasty, Wanyan Wuyashu and Aguda, with the aims of also preventing potential aggressions from the Jurchen tribes. Led by prominent generals such as Yun Kwan and Ch'ŏk Chun-gyŏng, the well-trained Byeolmuban (別武班; "Special Warfare Army") of approximately 250,000 men initially succeeded in ravaging Jurchen territories and building the strategic "Nine Fortresses" (동북 9성, 東北九城) of which exact locations are still topics of debate. Following the invasion, numerous Jurchen tribes surrendered to the invading Korean forces but many stayed vigilant and resumed fierce resistance led by the Wanyan tribe, complicating the phase of the war. Despite the Koreans of Goryeo having proceeded to utilizing scorched earth tactics, the Jurchen tribes under the leadership of Wanyan Wuyashu achieved a pyrrhic victory as Goryeo considered securing the Nine Fortresses too costly albeit having the upper hand in the war. Contacted by the Jurchens of the Wanyan tribe that have tasted the bitterness as well of facing Korean forces in their homes for peace, Goryeo would eventually move on to reluctantly signing a peace agreement with the Wanyan tribe and later on ceded the Nine Fortresses to Wuyashu. Though the objective of reclaiming former ancestral lands failed, Goryeo managed to maintain peaceful relations with the Jin dynasty which progress in conquering the Liao and Northern Song dynasty respectively.

During the reign of Jurchen leader Wuyashu in 1103–1113, the border between the two nations was stabilized and Korean forces withdrew from Jurchen territories, acknowledging Jurchen control over the contested region.

In 1115 the Jurchen founded the Jin dynasty, and in 1125 Jin annihilated Liao, which was Goryeo's suzerain, and started invasion of Song. In response to the circumstantial changes, Goryeo declared itself to be a tributary state of Jin in 1126. After that, peace was maintained and Jin never actually did invade Goryeo.

=== Military regime ===
Although the military founded Goryeo, its authority was in decline. In 1014, a coup occurred, but the effects of the rebellion did not last long, only making generals discontent with the current supremacy of the civilian officers.

In addition, under the reign of King Uijong, military officers were prohibited from entering the Security Council, and even at times of state emergency, they were not allowed to assume commands. After political chaos, Uijong started to enjoy traveling to local temples and studying sutra, while a large group of civilian officers almost always accompanied him. The military officers were largely ignored and mobilized to construct temples and ponds.

In 1170, a group of army officers led by Chŏng Chung-bu, Yi Ŭi-bang and Yi Ko launched a coup d'état and succeeded. King Uijong went into exile, and King Myeongjong was placed on the throne beginning its military rule. In 1179, the young general Kyŏng Tae-sŭng rose to power and began attempting to restore the monarch's full power and purge the state's corruption with his elite guard unit known as the Tobang.

However, he died in 1183 and was succeeded by Yi Ŭi-min, who came from a nobi (enslaved person) background. His unrestrained corruption and cruelty led to a coup by general Ch'oe Ch'ung-hŏn, who assassinated Yi Ui-min and took supreme power in 1197. For the next 61 years, the Ch'oe house ruled as military dictators, maintaining the Kings as puppet monarchs; Ch'oe Ch'ung-hŏn was succeeded in turn by his son Ch'oe U, his grandson Ch'oe Hang and his great-grandson Ch'oe Ŭi.

Ch'oe Ch'ung-hŏn forced Myeongjong off the throne and replaced him with King Sinjong. What was different from former military leaders was the active involvement of scholars in Ch'oe's control, notably Prime Minister Yi Kyu-bo, who was a Confucian scholar-official. After Sinjong died, Ch'oe forced his son to the throne as Huijong. After seven years, Huijong led a revolt but failed. Then, Ch'oe found the pliable King Gojong instead. Although the House of Ch'oe established strong private individuals loyal to it, continuous invasion by the Mongols ravaged the whole land, resulting in a weakened defense ability, and the power of the military regime waned.

=== Mongol Invasions ===
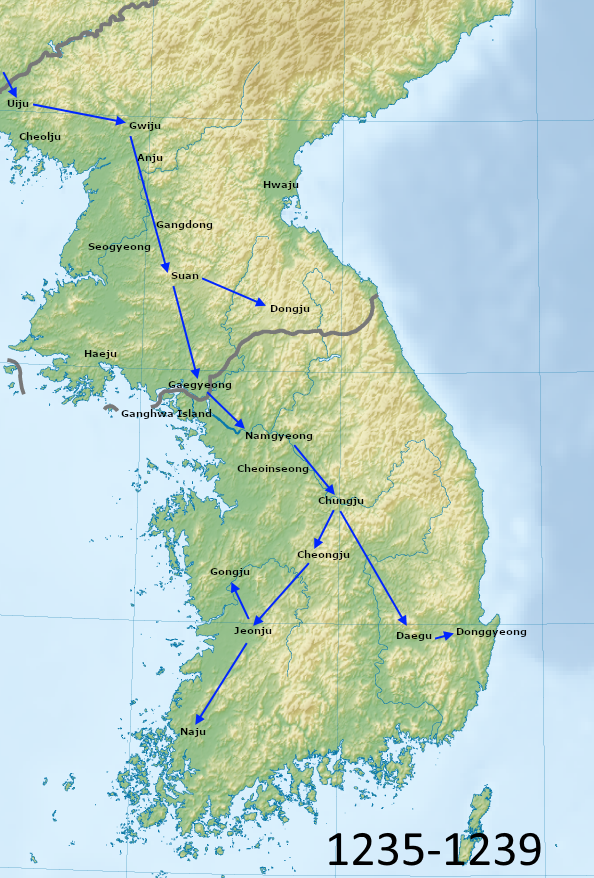
Map of the Mongol Invasions of Korea

Fleeing from the Mongols, in 1216, the Khitans invaded Goryeo. They defeated the Korean armies multiple times, even reaching the gates of the capital and raiding deep into the south, but were dominated by Korean General Kim Ch'wi-ryŏ (김취려; 金就礪) who pushed them back north to Pyongan, where the remaining Khitans were finished off by allied Mongol-Goryeo forces in 1219.

Tension continued through the 12th century and into the 13th century when the Mongol invasions started. During the House of Ch'oe's military rule, Goryeo resisted invasions by the Mongol Empire for nearly 30 years until swearing allegiance to the Mongols, with the direct dynastic rule of Goryeo monarchy.

In 1231, Mongols under Ögedei Khan invaded Goryeo following the aftermath of joint Goryeo-Mongol forces against the Khitans in 1219. The royal court moved to Ganghwado in the Bay of Gyeonggi in 1232. The military ruler of the time, Ch'oe U, insisted on fighting back. Goryeo resisted for about 30 years but finally sued for peace in 1259.

Meanwhile, the Mongols began a campaign from 1231 to 1259 that ravaged parts of Gyeongsang and Jeolla. There were six significant campaigns: 1231, 1232, 1235, 1238, 1247, and 1253; between 1253 and 1258, the Mongols under Möngke Khan's general Jalairtai Qorchi launched four devastating invasions against Korea at tremendous cost to civilian lives throughout the Korean peninsula.

Civilian resistance was strong, and the Imperial Court at Ganghwa attempted to strengthen its fortress. Korea won several victories, but the Korean military could not withstand the waves of invasions. The repeated Mongol attacks caused havoc, loss of human lives, and famine in Korea. In 1236, Gojong ordered the recreation of the Tripitaka Koreana, which was destroyed during the 1232 invasion. This collection of Buddhist scriptures took 15 years to carve on 81,000 wooden blocks and is still preserved.

In March 1258, the dictator Ch'oe Ŭi was assassinated by Kim Chun after which authority was restored to the monarchy and peace was made with the Mongols; however, power struggles continued in the court, and military rule did not end until 1270. Thus, dictatorship by his military group was ended, and the scholars who had insisted on peace with Mongolia gained power. Goryeo was never conquered by the Mongols, but exhausted after decades of fighting, Goryeo sent Crown Prince Wonjong to the Yuan capital to swear allegiance to the Mongols; Kublai Khan accepted, and married one of his daughters to the Korean crown prince. Kublai, who became khan of the Mongols and emperor of China in 1260, did not impose direct rule over most of Goryeo. In contrast to Song China, Goryeo Korea was treated more like an Inner Asian power. The dynasty was allowed to survive, and intermarriage with Mongols was encouraged, even with the Mongol imperial family. At the same time, marriage between the Chinese and Mongols was strictly forbidden when the Song dynasty ended. Some military officials who refused to surrender formed the Sambyeolcho Rebellion and resisted in the islands off the southern shore of the Korean Peninsula.

=== Mongol Invasions of Japan ===
In 1266, Kublai Khan dispatched emissaries several times to Japan, demanding that Japan become a vassal and send tribute under the threat of conflict, some through Goryeo Emissaries but the Kamakura shogunate despite the Japanese Imperial Court's request for compromise rejected them. The Mongols forced Goryeo to build warships to invade Japan, using their country as a stepping stone to conquer Japan through Kyushu, Tsushima, and their surrounding islands.

==== First Invasion ====
The Yuan invasion force was composed of 15,000 Mongol, Han Chinese, and Jurchen soldiers, 6,000 to 8,000 Korean troops, and 7,000 Korean sailors. While the defending Japanese forces comprise 4,000 to 6,000 Japanese. They engaged the Japanese in conquering Tsushima, Iki Islands, and made landfall at Hakata Bay beginning the Battle of Bun'ei. After landing in the bay, the Yuan force quickly overran the town of Hakata (now a ward of Fukuoka), but were engaged by several samurai soon afterward.

At first, the Yuan and Korean forces outnumbered the samurai, who were accustomed to smaller-scale clan rivalries; they could not match the organization and massed firepower of the invaders. Yuan forces fought with precision, loosing heavy volleys of arrows into the ranks of the Japanese. The Yuan also employed an early form of rocket artillery, and their infantry used phalanx-like tactics, holding off the samurai with their shields and spears. Though unable to defeat the Yuan forces conclusively, the Japanese fought hard and inflicted heavy casualties.

The Mongols burned Hakozaki Shrine to the ground during the day's fighting.

Despite their initial victories, the Yuan did not pursue the further samurai inland to the defenses at Dazaifu. Nihon Ōdai Ichiran explains that the Mongols lost due to their limited supply of arrows.

More likely, this resulted from their unfamiliarity with the terrain, the expectation of Japanese reinforcements, and the heavy losses already suffered. The Yuan forces, which may have intended to carry out a survey in force rather than an immediate invasion, returned to their ships. That night, the Yuan lost roughly one-third of its force in a typhoon. They retreated to Korea, presumably at the prodding of their sailors and captains, rather than regrouping and continuing their attack.

==== Second Invasion ====
More than 1,500 ships were requisitioned for the invasion: 600 from Southern China, 900 from Korea. Reportedly 40,000 troops were amassed in Korea and 100,000 in Southern China. Those numbers are likely an exaggeration, but the addition of Southern Chinese resources probably meant the second invasion force was still several times larger than the first invasion. Nothing is known about the size of the Japanese forces.

By June 1281, 900 Yuan ships were gathered in Korea; the force was called the Eastern Route Army. They were crewed by 17,000 sailors, and transported 10,000 Korean soldiers and 15,000 Mongols and Chinese. The Southern Route Army, meanwhile, was assembled just south of the Yangtze River, in China. It is said to have consisted of 100,000 men on 3,500 ships. As before, Iki and Tsushima islands fell quickly to the much larger Yuan forces beginning the Battle of Kōan.

The Eastern Route Army arrived at Hakata Bay on June 23, and decided to proceed with the invasion without waiting for the larger Southern force which had still not left China. They were a short distance to the north and east of where their force had landed in 1274, and were in fact beyond the walls and defenses constructed by the Japanese. The samurai responded quickly, assaulting the invaders with waves of defenders, denying them the beachhead.

At night small boats carried small bands of samurai into the Yuan fleet in the bay. Under cover of darkness they boarded enemy ships, killed as many as they could, and withdrew before dawn. This harassing tactic led the Yuan forces to retreat to Tsushima, where they would wait for the Southern Route Army. However, over the course of the next several weeks, 3,000 men were killed in close quarters combat in the hot weather. Yuan forces never gained a beachhead.

The first of the Southern force ships arrived on July 16, and by August 12 the two fleets were ready to attack Japan. On August 15 a major tempest struck the Tsushima Straits, lasting two full days and destroying most of the Yuan fleet. Contemporary Japanese accounts indicate that over 4,000 ships were destroyed in the storm; 80% of the Yuan soldiers either drowned or were killed by samurai on the beaches. The loss of ships was so great that "a person could walk across from one point of land to another on a mass of wreckage".

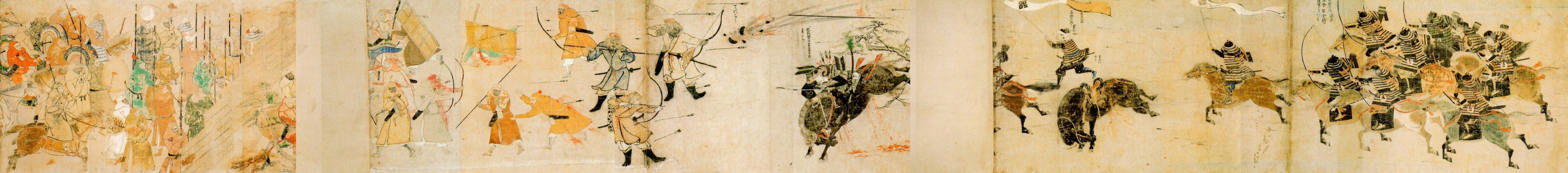
Takezaki Suenaga and escaping Mongolians and Goryeo soldiers

=== Independence ===
Gongmin regained Goryeo's Independence in the mid 14th century, and afterward Generals Ch'oe Yŏng and Yi Sŏng-gye rose to prominence with victories over invading Red Turban armies from the north and Wokou marauders from the south.

==== Repelling the Yuan ====
King Gongmin was forced to spend many years at the Yuan court, being sent there in 1341 as a virtual prisoner before becoming king. He married the Mongol Princess Noguk as the queen consort. In the mid-14th century, the Yuan dynasty was beginning to crumble due to the Red Turban Rebellion. He used the conflict to reform the Korean government, abolish Mongolian military outposts, purge pro-Yuan sentiments, and regain lost northern territories such as Liaoyang. The Goryeo army retook these provinces partly thanks to defection from Yi Jachun, a minor Korean official in service of Mongols in Ssangseong, and his son Yi Sŏng-gye. In addition, Generals Yi Sŏng-gye and Ji Yongsu led a campaign into Liaoyang and conquered it in 1356. The final attempt by the Yuan to dominate Goryeo failed when General Ch'oe Yŏng defeated an invading Mongol tumen in 1364.

==== Red Turban Rebellion ====
The Red Turbans attacked Goryeo, most likely because of military necessity. In December 1359, part of the Red Turban army moved their base to the Liaodong Peninsula. However, they were experiencing a shortage of war materials and lost their withdrawal route to China. The Red Turban army led by Mao Ju-jing invaded Goryeo and took the city of Pyongyang. In January 1360, the Goryeo army led by An U and Yi Bang-sil retook Pyongyang and the northern region that the enemy had captured. Of the Red Turban army that had crossed the Yalu River, only 300 troops returned to Liaoning after the war. In November 1360, the Red Turban troops invaded Goryeo's northwest border with 200,000 troops again, and they occupied Gaegyeong, the capital of Goryeo, for a short period, King Gongmin escaped to Andong. However, Generals Ch'oe Yŏng, Yi Sŏng-gye (later Taejo of Joseon), Jeong Seun and Yi Bang-sil repulsed the Red Turban army. Sha Liu and Guan Xiansheng, who were Red Turban generals, were killed in the battles. The Goryeo army continually chased their enemy and repelled them from the Korean Peninsula.

==== Wokou Raids ====
The Mongol Invasions reduced the coastal defense capabilities of Goryeo, and the Wokou Pirates gradually intensified their looting on the coasts of Goryeo. Chŏng Mong-ju was dispatched to Japan to deal with the problem, and during his visit Kyushu governor Imagawa Sadayo suppressed the early wokou, later returning their captured property and people to Korea.

According to Korean records, Wako pirates were particularly rampant roughly from 1350. After almost annual invasions of the southern provinces of Jeolla and Gyeongsang, they migrated northwards to the Chungcheong and Gyeonggi areas. The History of Goryeo has a record of sea battles in 1380 whereby one hundred warships were sent to Jinpo to rout Japanese pirates there, releasing 334 captives, Japanese sorties decreasing then after. The Wako pirates were effectively expelled through gunpowder technology, which the Wako lacked after Goryeo founded the Office of Gunpowder Weapons in 1377 (but abolished twelve years later). During the 1380s, Goryeo turned its attention to the wokou menace and used naval artillery created by Ch'oe Mu-sŏn to annihilate hundreds of pirate ships.

=== Winhan Retreat and Fall ===
In 1388, King U (son of King Gongmin and a concubine,) and general Ch'oe Yŏng planned a campaign to invade present-day Liaoning of China. King U put General Yi Sŏng-gye (later Taejo) in charge. Still, he stopped at the border and retreated from Wihwando to defeat Ch'oe Yŏng and overthrow the king; he replaced and put to death the last three Goryeo kings, usurped the throne, and established in 1392 the Joseon dynasty, bringing an end to 474 years of Goryeo rule on the Korean Peninsula.

== Organization ==
In the beginning, Goryeo relied heavily on the private armies of the powerful local clans. However, its military system was gradually expanded into a centrally controlled system. It was a dual system of a professional regular army, and mandatory reserve forces was adopted to cope with such military situations. People were enlisted in the military registry regardless of sex and age, and all the men between 16 and 60 years of age were conscribed if necessary. Therefore, a minimal regular military force was maintained by each province, enabling people to carry on with their lives, and people were mobilized only during an emergency.

The Two Armies (gun) and the Six Divisions (wi) were established in the capital area, while the corps called Juhyeon or Jujin were formed in local areas. The Two Armies and the Six Divisions had a total of 45 units (Yŏng), with each unit consisting of 1,000 soldiers. The commanders of the central army constituted the Council of Generals (중방; 重房; chungbang). The juhyeon corps in the countryside consisted of peasants. The jujin corps at the frontier, Yanggye, were standing armies.

=== Ministry of War ===
The Ministry of War (병부; 兵部; Pyŏngbu) was an administrative agency of Goryeo. It is an institution in charge of national defense. Before King Seongjong of Goryeo, the name Byeonggwan was used, and after King Seongjong of Goryeo, it was renamed Pyŏngbu. Then, during the Yuan dynasty, it renamed as the Kunbusa (군부사; 軍簿司) and later combined with the Ministry of Personnel to form the Ministry of Recruitment (선부; 選部; Sŏnbu). It regained its independence as the Ministry of War (Pyŏngbu) during King Gongmin, then was renamed to Kunbusa and later Ch'ongbu (총부; 摠部), and it was finally renamed Pyŏngjo (Korean: 병조; Hanja: 兵曹) during King Gongyang. The ministry was in charge of national defense, including operational planning, production and management of weapons, and personnel rights of military personnel. It was also in charge of transportation, such as carts and horses, communication methods, such as beacon fires and stations, and palace security.

=== Ranks ===
At the founding of Goryeo, there was no differentiation between military and civil ranks, but later separate ranks for the military officials were created, ranging from supreme general to sublieutenant. The 2-Gun and the 6-Wi had commanders called Sangjanggun (上將軍, Supreme General) and deputy commanders called Taejanggun (大將軍, Grand General). These Sangjanggun and Taejanggun formed a consultative body called the Council of Generals. Although the functions of the Council in the early Goryeo period are unclear, it was a gathering of the highest-ranking military officials directly under the top civil offices, thus having significant potential for wielding power. Each regiment (Yŏng) was commanded by a general (장군; 將軍; changgun), and these regimental commanders formed a consultative body called the Council of Commanders (장군방; 將軍房; changgunbang).

Ranks of the Goryeo Military
Rank	2 Armies (二軍)	6 Divisions (六衛)	Chungyong 4 Guards (忠勇四衛)
Chŏng 3-pum (정3품)	Supreme General (상장군; 上將軍; Sangjanggun)	Supreme General (상장군)	
Chong 3-pum (종3품)	Grand General (대장군; 大將軍; Taejanggun)	Grand General (대장군)	
Chŏng 4-pum (정4품)	General (장군; 將軍; Changgun)	General (장군)	General (장군)
Chŏng 5-pum (정5품)	Senior Colonel (중랑장; 中郎將; Chungnangjang)	Senior Colonel (중랑장)	Senior Colonel (중랑장)
Chŏng 6-pum (정6품)	Junior Colonel (낭장; 郎將; Nangjang)	Junior Colonel (낭장)	Junior Colonel (낭장)
Jong 6-pum (종6품)		Administrator (장사; 長史; Changsa)	
Chŏng 7-pum (정7품)	Subcolonel (별장; 別將; Pyŏlchang)	Subcolonel (별장)	Subcolonel (별장)
Chŏng 8-pum (정8품)	Executive Captain (산원; 散員; Sanwŏn)	Executive Captain (산원), Recorder (녹사; Noksa)	Executive Captain (산원)
Chŏng 9-pum (정9품)	Lieutenant (교위; 校尉; Kyowi)	Lieutenant (교위)	Guard Leader (위장; Wijang)
Chong 9-pum (종9품)	Sublieutenant (대정; 隊正; Taejŏng)	Sublieutenant (대정)	Sublieutenant (대정)

== Royal Guard ==
The Jung-gun of the three guns under King Taejo during the early days of Goryeo became the origin of the military. It was not until King Hyeonjong introduced the 2-gun system as the central army's military unit. When Khitan invaded Goryeo in 1010 (1st year of King Hyeonjong), Hyeonjong took refuge in Naju, but he still felt threatened because there were only a few royal guards. After a few years, in 1014 (5th year of King Hyeonjong), Kim Hun, Ch'oe Chil, and various others triggered a political upheaval, and the King planned to reinforce elite guards for his safety. There were already 6-Ui in the central army, but the King established a higher ranking 2-gun elite guard unit. The 2-gun refers to Eungyang-gun and Yongho-gun. They were the King's royal elite guards during the early days of Goryeo. The soldiers affiliated with the 2-gun were called Gunbansijok, and they enlisted in the army for management. It was a form of professional soldier position receiving wages from the government, passed on to descendants by succession.

The 2-gun's duty was to escort the King and protect the royal palace. Hengyang-gun consisted of a single regiment, and Yongho-gun was composed of two and three regiments. One regiment was the fundamental military unit of the Gore era, which consisted of 1,000 soldiers. In other words, the 2-gun consisted of 3,000 soldiers. This figure is minuscule compared to the 6-Ui, which comprises 42 regiments. However, the soldiers affiliated with the 2-gun were very close to the King, which allowed them to attain significant political growth compared to other ordinary positions. The King assigned a Sangjanggun and Daejanggun to each Gun. Sangjanggun, the commanding officer of Eungyang-gun, was the highest ranking position and was appointed as the chairperson of the Jungbang, which was the highest conference organization of Muban, the military nobility. The King also assigned military personnel of general status as the commanding officer of each regiment. Jungnangjang, Nangjang, Byeonjang, Sangwon, 5-ui, Daejeong, etc., were subordinate to each commanding officer.

During King Gongmin's reign, the Chungyongwi (忠勇衛), a royal guard unit commanded by a general, was newly established, consisting of 4 regiments.

== Central Army ==
The army under King Taejo in the early days of Goryeo was composed of soldiers directly subordinate to Taejo, military units of Taebong, and influential regional clans. These individual groups were reorganized as an official national military organization known as the Central Army. In 936 (19th year of Taejo), when waging the unification war against Sin Geom's army of Post Baekje, Goryeo's military comprised Junggun, Jwagang, and Ugang. The royal elite guards are assumed to have formed the Junggun, and all other soldiers formed the parent of the 6-Wi. 6-Wi is believed to have been installed around 995 (the 14th year of King Seongjong), which is the year when the central and regional governments were reorganized. The government reorganization also led to the reorganization of the military organization. The reorganization of the military disbanded the soldiers from regional clans; it was also for the central army to assemble all the country's soldiers under the king's command. Then, amendments were applied in 998 (1st year of King Mokjong) to make 6-Wi and Jae-Wi eligible to receive Jeonsigwa (a minor). Before the amendments, 6-Wi was reorganized to lay the economic foundations of the affiliated soldiers.

6-Wi, the central army organization, refers to Jwau-Wi, Sinho-Wi, Heungwi-Wi, Geumo-Wi, Cheonu-Wi, and Gammun-Wi. The central army, composed of 2-gun and 6-Wi, consisted of 45,000 soldiers, of which 42,000 were affiliated with the 6-Wi. The main forces of the 6-Wi were Jwau-Wi, Sinho-Wi, and Heungwi-Wi, 32,000 soldiers were enlisted in the 3-Wi. The 3-Wi comprised 32 regiments of the overall 42 regiments, and each regiment consisted of 1,000 soldiers, meaning that there were 32,000 soldiers in the 3-Wi. It accounts for over 70% of the entire central army (45,000). The mentioned 3-Wi were also called Sam-Wi to distinguish them from the others. They were the main forces of the central army. They were responsible for escorting the king as well as foreign ambassadors. They took part in major national events. The remaining 3-Wi were summoned according to the needs of their function. Geumo-Wi was a police unit responsible for ensuring public safety in the capital. Cheonu-Wi was the honor guard serving the king, and Gammun-Wi was assigned to watch duties at the gates of the capital city.

== Provincial Army ==
=== Northern Provinces ===
A regional military organization was installed in the Yanggye region during the early Goryeo period. The northern border region during the Goryeo period consisted of Bukgye and Donggye, collectively called Yanggye. Military camps were installed in the Yanggye region because it was an administrative region with military solid traits. The troops stationed in the military camps at Yanggye were called Jujin-gun, Regional policies were organized during the time of King Seongjong. and the organization of Jujin-gun was also implemented. Strongholds surrounded each military base, and Jujin-gun was responsible for regional defense duties. The subjects of Jujin-gun consisted mainly of farmers and local officials who were also a part of Jujin-gun.

Jujin-gun consisted of more diverse army branches than the Juhyeon -gun in Namdo region, and they were more significant in number as well, soldiers of Bukgye consisted of Chogun, Jeongyong. Jwagun, Ugun, Bochang and Singi, Boban, Baekjeong, etc. Donggye consisted of Chogun, Jwagun, Ugun, Youngsae, and Gongjang. Jeonjang, Tuhwa, Saengcheongun, Sagong, etc. Also, in Seogyeong (Pyongyang in the present day), a military unit composed of naval forces and Wonjoengyangbangunhaninjabnyu was installed. Among them, Chogun (Jeongyong), Jwagun, Ugun, Bochang, Youngsae, etc., formed the primary military force of Jujin-gun. They were a standing army, ready for the battle.

There were 40,000 soldiers in the Bukgye region, and 11,000 soldiers in the Donggye region, Also, Singi, Boban, Gongjang of Baekjeong and Donggye, Jeonjang. Tuhwa, Saengcheongun, Sagong. etc., assisted the primary combat unit. The total number of troops amounted to roughly 75,000 men. The military power of Yanggye amounted to roughly 140,000, including all the commanding officers.

Bangeosa, the region's minister, and Jinjang, the district's leaders, commanded Yanggye's military organization. They were responsible for the regional administrative duties and managed the military affairs with Minjeong. Commissioned officers of ranks between Jungnangjang and Daejeong directly commanded Jujingun. These men had significant influence over the settling in the Yanggye region. The chief commanding officer of the standing army of each military camp was called Doryeong. Jungnangjang or Nangjang was appointed as the Doryeong depending on the scale of the competent Jujingun. Each Doryeong was subordinate to the Bangeosa or Jinjang, responsible for the overall military administration duties. The Bangeosa and Jinjang were subordinate to Byeongmasa, the chief commander of Yanggye Jujingun. Jujingun gradually collapsed due to battles waged against the Mongolians. Mongolian invasions seized most military camps, and Yanggye's military organization gradually collapsed.

=== Southern Provinces ===
A regional military organization was installed in 5 southern provinces and Gyeonggi during the early Goryeo period. During the early days of Goryeo, Juhyeon-gun system was established by organizing troops subordinate to regional clans and people under their influence as a military organization. Gwanggun, was found as a defense against Kitan's invasions during King Jeongjong and Jinsugun. They were dispatched to various regions during the early days of the nation's establishment, where the origin of the Juhyeon-gun was. The regional systems established during King Seongjong and Hyeonjong were reorganized, and a regional military organization was newly formed. Juhyeon-gun organization is assumed to have been established around 1018 (9th year of King Hyeonjong). Juhyeon-gun was a military organization that allocated military units in the five provinces of Gyeonggi and within Gyeonggi territory. The military units were formed by assigning regional administrative districts centered on Ju, bu, Gun, and Hyeon, to which provincial officials were posted, Juhyeon-gun was composed of Boseung, Jeongyong, and Ipum, Boseunggun consisted of 8,601 soldiers, Jeongyong-gun 19,745 soldiers, and Ipumgun 19,882 soldiers. The total military power amounted to 48,237 soldiers. Also, there was a 2,3 pumgun composed of farmers that provided support. The main force of Juhyeon-gun were Boseung and Jeongyong. 'They were mainly deployed into battles and took the responsibility of border defense in yearly rotations. Ipumgun was a labor unit in charge of general public military duties. The majority of Juhyeon-gun was deployed for significant battles. Juhyeon-gun mainly consisted of local farmers regarded as competent to fulfill military obligations, and local officials were also subject to enlistment. Regional and local officials or commissioned officers were appointed to command Juhyeon-gun, Juhyeon-gun system remained active until a full-fledged war against the Mongolians broke loose. The organization gradually collapsed as the war persisted for an extended period, and it became systematically challenging to support them, Juhyeon-gun disappeared during the latter days of the battle against the Mongolians.

== Navy ==
The Goryeo government never established a naval system, but there was a government official for naval forces (Sasu-si, 사수시; 司水寺) as part of the Ministry of War. However, since it was installed in 1390 (the 2nd year of King Gongyang), at the end of the Goryeo period, it was not significant and did not affect the Goryeo dynasty. The government established the Seonbyeongdo Department (Seonbyeongdobuseo, 선병도부서; 船兵都部署) in areas where pirates frequently invaded or required maritime security.

=== Seonbyeongdo Department ===
The Seonbyeongdo Department is a naval corps that defeats or captures pirates' ships, captures or beheads pirates, repatriates drifters, etc. The mission of the Seonbyeongdo department was to defend and guard the sea as the main force of the navy. The Seonbyeongdo Departments were in the Jinmyeong, Wonheung, Donggye, Tongju, and Apgang administrative districts in the Northern (Bukgye) and Southern (Namhae) regions. The official positions of the department were the Admiral (Seonbyeongbyeolgam, 선병별감; 船兵別監), Commander (Sa, (사; 使), Deputy Commander (Busa, 부사; 副使), and Master-at-arms (Panwon, 판관; 判官), but they were not uniform. The government also established Seonbyeongdo Department when needed rather than permanently for a certain period. A military magistrate respectively commanded the northern seas, and governors controlled those in the southern seas (Anchalsa, 안찰사; 按察使.

In the early Goryeo period, the pirates from the Eastern Jurchens (Dong Yeojin, 동여진; 東女眞), who frequently invaded the East Coastal Region, were defeated by the naval forces in the Seonbyeongdo department during the winter season. The naval forces in the Seonbyeongdo department in the Northern Regions fought foreign enemies such as Khitan and the Jurchens. During Yejong's reign, General Yun-Gwan led 2,600 naval forces from the Seonbyeongdo department in a winter's conquest against the Jurchens as they were active in Dorinpo County. In 1275 (the 15th year of King Wonjong), they invaded Japan with the Mongols, consisting of 5,300 Goryeo soldiers, 900 Byeongseon ships transporting carriers (chogong, 초공; 梢工) of great millets (Susu, 수수; 蜀黍) participated in the war. In 1281 (the 7th year of King Chungnyeol), during the 2nd Japanese conquest, at the request of the Mongols, 900 battleships, 15,000 provincial soldiers, 10,000 regular soldiers, and 110,000 straw sacks (seog, 석) were prepared, but there was not much different from the number in the actual expedition as the carriers for the millets form a part of the naval force.

At the end of the Goryeo period, the Wokou were plundered, murdered, and arson in the coastal and inland areas. General Jeong Ji, who insisted on fostering naval forces, became Marshal of Haedo and defeated Japanese ships in Jinpo County, Gunsan Island, etc. General Park Wi made great achievements, such as conquering Tsushima, the den of Wokous, and burning 300 Japanese ships with 100 battleships, showing that naval activity was very active in the late Goryeo period. However, the records of the late Goryeo period do not show the Seonbyeongdo department's activities, as the government abolished the department in the late Goryeo period.

=== Ships ===
Korean shipbuilding again excelled during the Goryeo dynasty. The two main ships that served in the early period navy were the Gwaseon, (dagger-axe ship, 과선; 戈船 and the Daenuseon (big tower ship, 대누선; 大樓船. The Daenuseon was a large military vessel with a large pavilion and two masts used by King Taejo in naval battles during the unification of the later three kingdoms. In 1010, Goryeo shipbuilders developed the Gwaseon; the ship was designed to sail fast and ram and destroy Japanese and Jurchen pirate vessels that were attacking Korean coastal cities with spears attached to the bow.

Two main ships served in the late navy, the Nujeonseon (tower war ship, (누전선; 樓戰船), and the Pyeongjeonseon (flat war ship, (평전선; 平戰船). The Nujeonseon and the Pyeongjeonseon were warships built to protect against Wokou Raids during the Goryeo dynasty, and they participated in the Invasion of Japan. These warships were large enough to carry 200 or more fighting marines. They are also robust in size and durability and have flat-hulls to withstand the Kamikaze. When the Wokou raided Goryeo, Ch'oe Mu-sŏn outfitted them with cannons and rocket launchers. Ch'oe's objective was to sink and burn the Woku fleet from long distances to prevent them from boarding. The Nujeonseon deck comprises four cannons and two rocket launchers, two cannons and one rocket launcher on each side. The Pyeongjeonseon deck contains four guns and six rocket launchers, two cannons, and three rocket launchers on each side. However, there are instances where these two ships could carry up to ten guns and eight rocket launchers each, as their flat-bottomed hulls would allow the vessel to fire with less recoil.

== Equipment ==
=== Armor ===
During the Goryeo dynasty, a distinctive style of armor known as the durumagi-type armor (두루마기형 갑옷), or robe-shaped (po-hyeong, 포형, 袍型) armor appeared. According to the Goryeosa (History of Goryeo), various types of armor differing in material and color were produced under state supervision, including uigap (의갑, 衣甲) – clothing armor, cheolgab (철갑, 鐵甲) – iron armor, uibaekgap (의백갑, 衣白甲) – white clothing armor, baekgab tomo (백갑토모, 白甲兎牟) – white armor with helmet, uijugap (의주갑, 衣朱甲) – red clothing armor, and jagap (자갑, 紫甲) – purple armor. When military officials wore armor, they carried their helmets over their backs rather than on their heads. In addition, soldiers wore an army robe called jeonpo (전포, 戰袍).

The exact form and structure of the armor are not clearly known. However, Xu Jing’s Illustrated Account of Goryeo (Goryeodogyeong) records that Goryeo’s elite Dragon-Tiger Central Fierce Army (Yongho Jungmaenggun, 용호중맹군, 龍虎中猛軍), numbering about 30,000 men, all wore armor. This armor was a robe-shaped suit with the upper and lower parts connected, without shoulder guards (bubak, 부박, 覆膊). Another general’s armor was described as iron lamellae (cheolchal, 철찰, 鐵札) covered with black leather, each plate stitched together with patterned silk so they were held in place. Furthermore, Japanese illustrations such as the Mōko Shūrai Ekotoba (몽고습래회사, 蒙古襲來繪詞, “Illustrated Account of the Mongol Invasions”) show that during the Goryeo-Mongol allied invasions of Japan, Goryeo soldiers wore long vest-like lamellar armor (찰갑, 札甲) and robe-shaped textile armor (포형 갑옷).

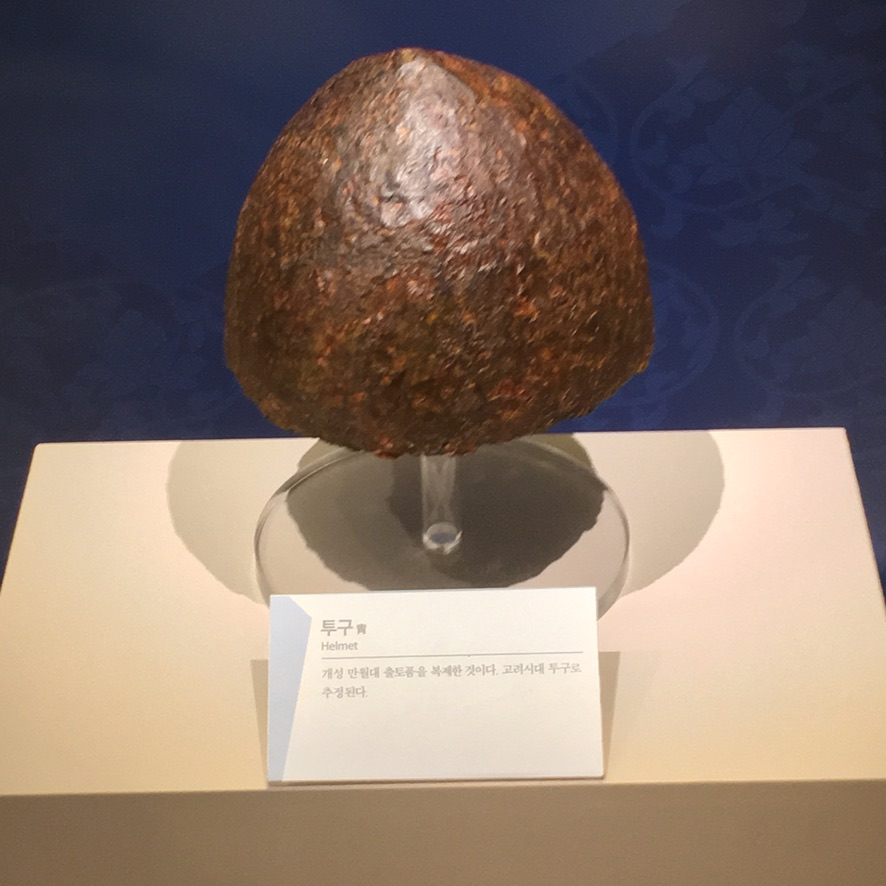
Helmet presumably from the Goryeo dynasty.

Three Goryeo soldiers (middle) wearing durumagi-styled armor.

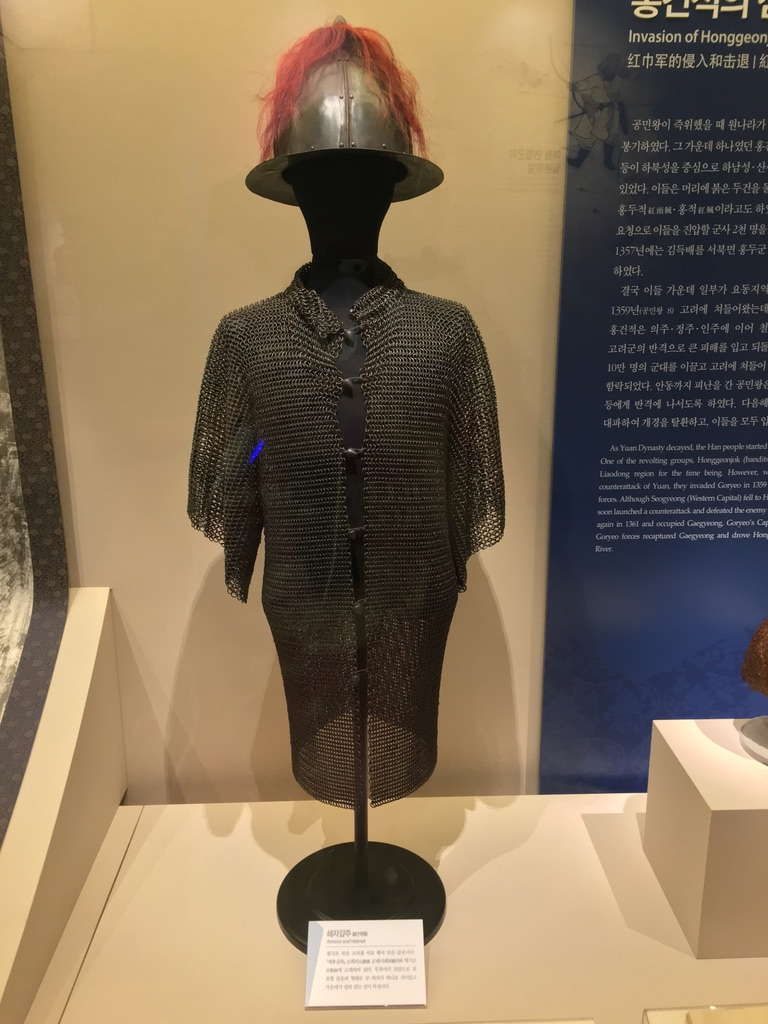
Chain Mail and helmet.

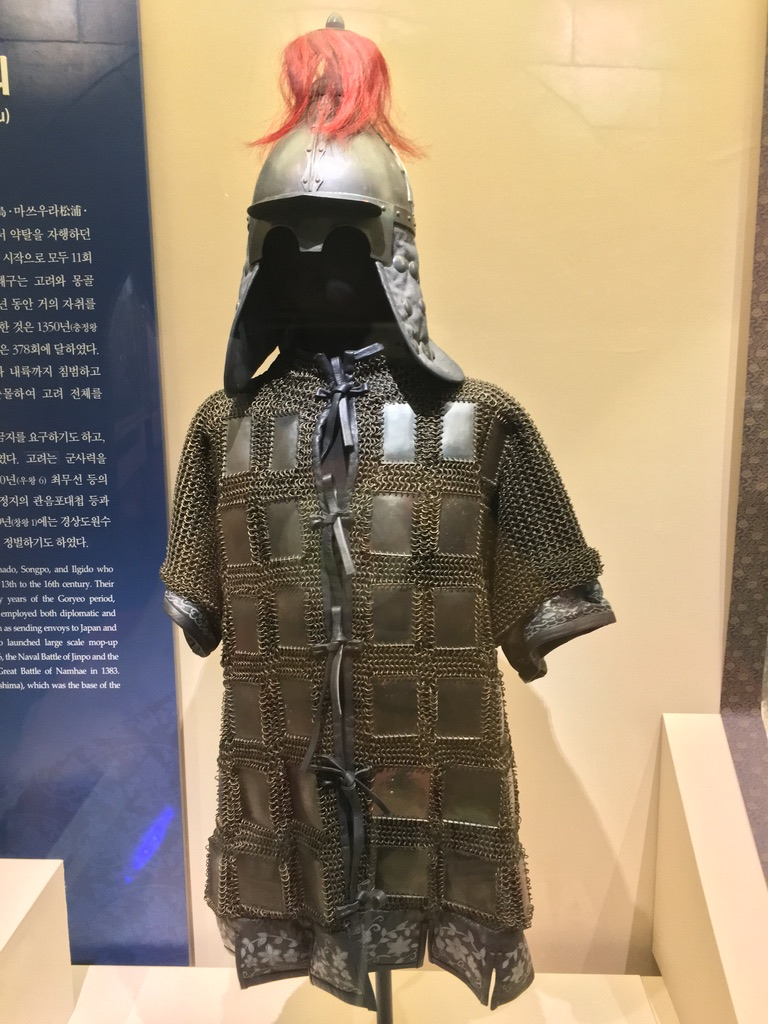
Mail and plate armor and helmet.

=== Weapons ===
Goryeo's weapons were spears, bows, catapults, and swords, inherited those of the Three Kingdoms period and used during the unification war of the Later Three Kingdoms.

==== Melee ====
Korean sword and blades were representative short weapons among traditional armaments, primarily used in close combat. These short weapons were designed for melee engagements. The do (도), or single-edged sword, had a curved shape with a blade on one side. Originally, it had a long handle and no sheath, and it was mainly used for slashing. In contrast, the geom (검), or double-edged sword, had a straight shape with blades on both sides. It had a shorter handle than the do and came with a sheath, making it effective for slashing and thrusting. In battles, the do was more commonly used. Using the do in combat led to adopting sheaths, previously unique to the geom, for easier carrying.

These swords had a shape that tapered towards the tip, with a straight back. This design is an evolution from the swords of the Three Kingdoms period. Unlike the Hwandudaedo (환두대도) from the Three Kingdoms period, which lacked hand guards, Goryeo swords featured an oval-shaped guard between the blade and the handle to protect the wielder's hand. This corresponds with the descriptions in the Goryeosa and Goryeodogyeong (Illustrated Record of Goryeo), which mention long, straight swords with guards.

Goryeo used the gwa (戈, hooked spear) and mo (鉾, spear) in fortress-centered warfare against northern cavalry tribes. Unlike other weapons, the hooked spear could be used for stabbing or slashing, and the spear, with its sharp blade, was effective in cavalry combat.

==== Archery ====
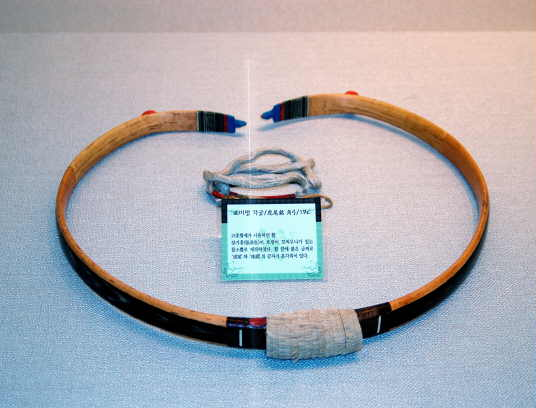
Gakgung, the standard bow for the Goryeo Army

Goryeo foot soldiers and cavalry often fought as archers with their bows, which had a range of 450 metres (1,480 ft). During the Goryeo period, which frequently experienced wars with foreign tribes, the bow was considered more important than any other weapon. The Goryeosa (History of Goryeo) records instances where the king would inspect soldiers, from generals down to ordinary soldiers, making them shoot at targets, and where civil officials practiced archery, underscoring the bow's importance. The crossbow (쇠뇌) and repeating crossbows were also crucial in Goryeo's resistance against invaders. Compared to bows, crossbows had the advantage of being convenient for defensive operations and ambush tactics. This was because the crossbow could shoot enemies from a confined space with minimal movement simply by pulling the trigger to release the bolt.

==== Gunpowder ====
The earliest possible references to firearms in Korea are to what might have been gunpowder-ignited flamethrowers in 1104 and explosive bombs in 1135. The next reference is to a cannon which fired large arrows being tested for use on the northwestern frontier in 1356.

Firearms were recognized by Goryeo military leaders as necessary for national defense. Constituting a particular threat were Japanese raiders, who frequently plundered coastal towns in increasing numbers from 1350 onward. Gunpowder and firearms explicitly for combating them on the sea were imported from China in 1374. However, Chinese government policy still restricted the necessary expertise for production.

Numerous ancient Chinese documents relating to gunpowder based weapons such as the Huolongjing were acquired by the Koreans in addition to small samples of Chinese gunpowder which the Koreans reverse engineered.

In 1373, King Gongmin visited a newly constructed fleet for use against the Wokou, including the firing of cannons. He then requested a shipment of cannon, gunpowder, and gunpowder ingredients from Ming, granted the following year. Local production did not begin until Ch'oe Mu-sŏn, a minor military official, learned potassium nitrate purification methods from a visiting Chinese saltpeter merchant. After petitioning the court for several years, the Firearms Directorate was established in 1377 to oversee firearms production and development. He accomplished it between 1374 and 1376.

Ch'oe Mu-sŏn, a Goryeo scientist, developed Korean cannon in the 14th century. They were soon developed to be used on Goryeo battleships and were used with success against the Mongol invasion. A government office for developing gunpowder and firearms was established in 1377, with Ch'oe appointed its head. By 1395, several weapons were developed here and in use: a series of cannons such as the daejanggunpo, hand-cannons such as the ijanggunpo, and samjanggunpo, a shell-firing mortar called the jillyeopo, series of yuhwa, juhwa, and chokcheonhwa rockets, which were the forerunners of the singijeon, and a signal gun called the shinpo.

A fleet of ships was trained in cannon use in 1378. In 1380, the Goryeo navy had implemented widespread use of cannons on board their ships attacked and a large wako fleet off of the Geum River which resulted in the near destruction of almost the entire wako fleet. The world's first naval artillery battle took place off the coast of Korea. In the Battle of Chinpo (1380), 80 Koryo warships, equipped with firearms invented by Choi Mu-son, sank 500 Japanese Wako, or pirate ships. Also, in 1383, Admiral Jeong Ji destroyed 17 wako pirate vessels using shipboard cannons. In 1389 a total of 300 Waegu ships were damaged, and over a hundred Korean prisoners were liberated in a raid on Tsushima ordered by Yi Sŏng-gye. Three years later, in 1383, the Korean navy defeated the Wokou with cannon.

== See also ==
- Goryeo
- Military History of Korea
  - Goryeo-Khitan War
  - Mongol invasions of Korea
  - Sambyeolcho Rebellion
  - Mongol invasions of Japan
  - Red Turban invasions of Goryeo
  - Wihwado Retreat
- Joseon
  - Joseon Army
  - Joseon Navy

== Sources ==
- Bielenstein, Hans (2005), Diplomacy and Trade in the Chinese World, 589–1276, BRILL, ISBN 978-90-474-0761-4
- Breuker, Remco E. (2010), Establishing a Pluralist Society in Medieval Korea, 918-1170: History, Ideology and Identity in the Koryŏ Dynasty, BRILL, ISBN 978-90-04-18325-4
- Ebrey, Patricia Buckley; Walthall, Anne (2014), Pre-Modern East Asia: To 1800: A Cultural, Social, and Political History, Third Edition, Boston: Wadsworth, Cengage Learning, ISBN 978-1-133-60651-2.
- Kim, Jinwung (2012), A History of Korea: From "Land of the Morning Calm" to States in Conflict, Indiana University Press, ISBN 978-0-253-00024-8
- Lee, Kyuchul (2017b), "The Changing International Circumstances & Foreign Conquest From Late Koryo to Early Chosun Dynasty", ̠전북사학, vol. 50, p. 92 – via Korea Citation Index
- Lee, Ki-baik (1984), A New History of Korea, translated by Wagner, Edward W.; Schultz, Edward J., Harvard University Press, ISBN 978-0-674-61576-2
- Rogers, Michael C. (1961), "Some Kings of Koryo as Registered in Chinese Works", Journal of the American Oriental Society, 81 (4): 415–422, doi:10.2307/595688, ISSN 0003-0279, JSTOR 595688
- Shultz, Edward (1 June 2000), Generals and Scholars: Military Rule in Medieval Korea, University of Hawaii Press, ISBN 978-0-8248-6263-3
- Turnbull, Stephen (2010), The Mongol Invasions of Japan 1274 and 1281, Osprey
- Twitchett, Denis C.; Fairbank, John King; Franke, Herbert (1994), The Cambridge History of China: Volume 6, Alien Regimes and Border States, 907–1368, Cambridge University Press, ISBN 978-0-521-24331-5
- Yuk, Jungim (2011), "The Thirty Year War between Goryeo and the Khitans and the International Order in East Asia", Dongbuga Yeoksa Nonchong (in Korean) (34): 11–52, ISSN 1975-7840
