= U Hagyu =

12th century Goryeo general

- Hangul: 우학유
- Hanja: 于學儒
- RR: U Hakyu
- MR: U Hagyu

U Hagyu (Korean: 우학유; Hanja: 于學儒; ? – June 13, 1179 (Note: In the Korean calendar (lunisolar), he died on the 9th day of the 5th Lunar month of the 9th year of Myeongjong's reign.)) was a Goryeo military official who served the Goryeo monarchy and later the Goryeo military regime.

== Biography ==
U Hagyu was the son of U Pangjae (우방재; 于邦宰), who served as Vice Director of the Right (우복야; 右僕射; u pogya). U Hagyu hailed from the Mokcheon U clan.

During U's time as a military official, the Goryeo military officials became extremely discontent with the discrimination by the civilian officials. U's father told him, "The military officials have seen injustice for too long. Is it possible for them not to be indignant?" U would be visited by Yi Ŭibang and Yi Ko, a pair of discontented military officials who were planning a military rebellion against the government of Goryeo. The two sought to make Grand General U the head of the coup. While U also had the same grievances against the civilian officials, U declined to participate, citing his father, who warned of potential consequences after killing the civilian officials. The two would instead choose Supreme General Chŏng Chungbu and successful executed the military rebellion in 1170. U would regret his choice to not support the rebellion. When Yi Ŭibang and Yi Ko intended to harm U Hagyu, the fearful U Hagyu would escape punishment by marrying Yi Ŭibang's older sister.

When Song Yuin, the military-appointed military commissioner (병마사; 兵馬使; pyŏngmasa) of Sŏbungmyŏn (서북면; 西北面), failed to deal with a series of revolts, U, who was then a Grand General in the Kŭmo-wi division, was sent to replace the beleaguered Song Yuin. On June 13, 1179, U Hagyu died. At the time of his death, U Hagyu held the position of associate commissioner of the Security Council (동지추밀원사; 同知樞密院事; tongji ch'umirwŏn sa).
