= Song Yu-in =

12th century Goryeo general

- Hangul: 송유인
- Hanja: 宋有仁
- RR: Song Yuin
- MR: Song Yuin

Song Yu-in (Korean: 송유인; Hanja: 宋有仁; ? – October 18, 1179 (Note: In the Korean calendar (lunisolar), he died on the 16th day of the 9th Lunar month of the 9th year of Myeongjong's reign.)) was a Goryeo military official who served the Goryeo military regime. The son-in-law of military ruler Chŏng Chung-bu, he was killed when Kyŏng Tae-sŭng took control of the government from his father-in-law.

== Biography ==
Song Yu-in was the son of a man who died defending Goryeo during the reign of King Injong. Due to his father's death on behalf of the nation, Song Yu-in was granted the rank of executive captain (산원; 散員; sanwŏn) via protected appointment. Song rose through the ranks to become a commander of the Household Bureau of the Crown Prince (태자부지유; 太子府指諭; t'aeja-pu chiyu) then general of the guards (위장군; 衛將軍; wi changgun). He married the ex-wife of a Song dynasty merchant. Despite being from the lowly cheonmin class, Song's wife was wealthy. Song was able to use his wealthy wife's money to bribe the eunuchs and obtained a government post. By the 1170 military coup, Song had achieved the rank of grand general (대장군; 大將軍; taejanggun).

Due to Song's connections to the civilian officials, Song was disliked by the other military officials who despised the civilian officials for their treatment of the Goryeo military. After the 1170 Goryeo military coup, Song abandoned his wife and married the daughter of Chŏng Chung-bu, one of the ringleaders of the coup, in order to avoid persecution. Song would be appointed the military commissioner (병마사; 兵馬使; pyŏngmasa) of Sŏbungmyŏn (서북면; 西北面). However, when he was unable to deal with local revolts, he feigned illness and resigned from the role, and was replaced by General U Hakyu.

On January 23, 1175, Song Yu-in was appointed as vice commissioner of the Security Council (추밀원부사; 樞密院副使; ch'umirwŏnpusa) and the minister of war (병부상서; 兵部尙書; pyŏngbu sangsŏ). On January 30, Song was replaced as the minister of war by Chin Chun (진준; 陳俊), and Song was appointed as the minister of justice (형부상서; 刑部尙書; hyŏngbu sangsŏ) instead. Song would later also be promoted to Assistant Executive in Political Affairs (참지정사; 參知政事; ch'amji chŏngsa), and by the request of his wife, the daughter of Chŏng Chung-bu, he was promoted to acting Master of Works (수사공; 守司空; su sagong) and Secretariat for State Affairs Vice Director (상서복야; 尙書僕射; Sangsŏ pogya).

In 1178, when Chŏng retired from his government offices, Song Yu-in was given the office of the Vice-Director of the Chancellery (문하시랑평장사; 門下侍郎平章事; munhasirang p'yŏngjangsa). Song was also given permission from King Myeongjong to use Suchang Palace as Song's own residence. In 1179, he impeached Confucian scholar-officials Mun Kŭk-kyŏm and Han Mun-jun, demoting them from their positions at the Security Council. On October 18, Song and his father-in-law were killed by Kyŏng Tae-sŭng who opposed the rule of Chŏng and his family.
