= Yi Ŭimin =

Korean military leader (fl. 12th century)

Yi Ŭimin 이의민

Military Leader of Goryeo
- In office 1183–1196
- Monarch: Myeongjong of Goryeo
- Preceded by: Kyŏng Taesŭng
- Succeeded by: Ch'oe Ch'unghŏn

Personal details
- Born: Unknown
- Died: 7 May 1196
- Spouse: Lady Ch'oe
- Children: Yi Chiyŏng; Yi Chisun; Yi Chi'gwang; 2 unnamed daughters
- Parent: Yi Sŏn (father)

- Yi Ŭimin
- Hangul: 이의민
- Hanja: 李義旼
- RR: I Uimin
- MR: I Ŭimin

Yi Ŭimin (Korean: 이의민; Hanja: 李義旼; died 7 May 1196) was a powerful military dictator during the late Goryeo period who dominated the Goryeo government prior to the Mongol Invasions. When his rival, Commander Kyŏng Taesŭng, died, Yi Ŭimin rose to power in the Council of Generals as Supreme General and tongjungsŏ munha p'yŏngjangsa p'an pyŏngbu sa. He rose from a humble background to wield power for 12 years (1184–1196) during the early phase of the Goryeo Military Regime. Known for his physical strength and ruthlessness, he played key roles in quelling rebellions and consolidating military rule, but was eventually assassinated by Ch'oe Ch'unghŏn, marking the end of his regime and the beginning of the Choe military dictatorship.

== Biography ==
=== Early life ===
In a rigidly stratified society, Yi was born into one of the lowest social classes. His father Yi Sŏn (이선; 李善) was a salt and sieves trader and his mother was a slave at Okryeongsa Temple, located in Yeonil-hyeon. According to the History of Goryeo, he was as tall as 8 ch'ŏk or 1m 90 cm and possessed remarkable physical strength. Yi's pon'gwan was from Gyeongju.

=== Military ===
Yi Ŭimin and his two brothers became notorious local troublemakers. They were eventually arrested on orders from the regional inspector Kim Chayang (김자양; 金子陽) and rigorously tortured — his two brothers died, but Yi survived and was sent to the capital defense command (경군; 京軍), likely to remove him from local disturbances. Yi brought his wife and moved to the capital, Kaegyŏng. His impressive physique and martial skill in subak (hand-to-hand combat) caught the attention of King Uijong, who promoted him from sublieutenant (대정; 隊正; taejŏng) to subcolonel (별장; 別將; pyŏlchang).

In August 1170, the Military Revolt of 1170 dramatically changed Yi's life. Military commanders like Chŏng Chungbu, Yi Ŭibang, and Yi Ko overthrew the civil-dominated regime, deposed King Uijong, and slaughtered many civil officials. Yi Ŭimin actively participated in the coup. Records note: “Yi Ŭimin killed many during Chŏng Chungbu's revolt and was promoted to senior colonel (중랑장; 中郎將; chungnangjang), soon after becoming a general (장군; 將軍; changgun).”

In August 1173, Kim Podang, a military commander in the northeast, attempted a counter-coup by rescuing the exiled King Uijong and bringing him from Geoje to Gyeongju attempting to reinstate Uijong who had been dethroned by the political power of Chŏng Chungbu. As a result, Chŏng Chungbu then ordered Yi to return Uijong from his place of exile, Geoje, by rebel forces, only to kill him on his way back in Gyeongju. Though Uijong had once favored and promoted Yi, Yi murdered him brutally—after drinking with him at a pond near Gonwonsa Temple, he beat the king to death, breaking his spine and laughing at the sound. His accomplice Pak Chonwi (박존위; 朴存威) wrapped the body in a blanket and dumped it between two cauldrons in a pond. A monk retrieved only the cauldrons, leaving the body to float for days. Yi and Park boasted of this deed and were promoted — Yi became a Grand General (대장군; 大將軍; taejanggun).

After killing Uijong, Yi’s career soared. He become the highest-ranking military official: supreme general (상장군; 上將軍; sangjanggun), for the credit of putting down the Revolt of Cho Wich'ong (1174–1176), the governor of Pyongyang in the northwest and was wounded by an arrow in the eye but continued to fight.

During this time, Chŏng Chungbu held power. Yi continued to build his reputation by suppressing remaining rebels. However, in 1179, Kyŏng Taesŭng assassinated Chŏng Chungbu and seized control. Kyŏng, though a fellow general, resented Yi for killing the king, famously saying, "The king’s murderer still lives—what is there to celebrate?" Feeling threatened, Yi gathered elite troops and fortified his home. Kyŏng formed his own private guard (tobang) and tensions escalated.

In 1181, Yi was appointed Minister of Justice and dispatched to the frontier. When Kyŏng executed his own confidant Hŏ Sŭng (허승; 許升) for arrogance, rumors falsely reached Yi that Kyŏng had been killed. Delighted, Yi exclaimed, "I wanted to kill him myself, but someone beat me to it!" Kyŏng heard this, and Yi, afraid, feigned illness and returned to his hometown. Yi lacked a strong enough base to challenge him directly. Anticipating an attack, Yi recruited bodyguards and built a large gate ("Yomun") at his village for protection. Yi was powerful, and Kyŏng's reformist, pro-civil policies alienated other generals, making it hard to eliminate Yi outright. Nevertheless, feeling insecure, he eventually returned to Gyeongju, feigning illness.

== Dictator ==
When Kyŏng died by disease in 1183, King Myeongjong called Yi in to Kaegyŏng. Not believing the death of Kyŏng, Yi refused the king's request several times, but finally came to Kaegyŏng after realizing Kyŏng's death.

Yi who was commissioned as a su-sagong chwa pogya (수사공좌복야; 守司空左僕射) by Myeongjong had gotten a position of Chancellor of State (tongjungsŏ munha p'yŏngjangsa p'an pyŏngbu sa (동중서문하평장사 판병부사; 同中書門下平章事判兵部事)) in 1190 additionally. Though the official reason was fear of rebellion in Gyeongju, it was more likely that the king had deeper motives. Myeongjong, who had become king due to the military revolt, likely saw Kyŏng's desire to “restore the past” as a threat not only to the military regime but also to his own legitimacy. Thus, he may have preferred Yi, a fellow beneficiary of the revolt. At the same time, he appointed famed strongman Tu Kyŏngsŭng (두경승; 杜景升) to counterbalance Yi. The two reportedly clashed often. Goryeosa records in one meeting, Yi smashed a column with his fist to show off. Tu retaliated by cracking a wall with his punch. The farce became so famous that people mocked it with satirical poems.

After returning to the capital, Yi used a strategy of co-opting fellow military leaders. Even those who had been suppressed under Kyŏng Taesŭng, like Yi Yŏngjin (이영진; 李英搢) and Son Sŏk, re-entered political life. Yi’s regime included both former allies and enemies of Kyŏng, suggesting he tried to absorb all factions. This approach, however, was seen by some as a shallow attempt to gain prestige.

Yi’s regime brought institutional changes. He appointed military men to roles in the Institute of Palace Attendants (내시원; 內侍院; Naesiwŏn) and the Tea Chamber (다방; 茶房; Tabang) — positions previously reserved for civil officials or noble youth. Even Ch'oe Sebo (최세보; 崔世輔), who was reportedly illiterate, was appointed to co-editor of state history (동수국사; 同修國史; tongsuguksa), a role normally given to respected scholars. King Myeongjong even renamed the post, changing the character 史 to 事 to accommodate him.

People began calling Yi the "New Road Chancellor" (sindo chaesang)—allegedly because he built levees and planted willows. But the nickname likely symbolized how different he was from previous chancellors, not just his civil works. But as his authority grew, so did his tyranny.

Yi's brutality did not end with his rise to power—it worsened. He took bribes, seized homes and land, and forced marriages with beautiful women only to discard them. Officials were too afraid to challenge him. Yi's wife, Madam Ch'oe, was notorious for killing servants such as a maid out of jealousy and had an affair with a male servant. His sons, especially Yi Chiyŏng and Yi Chigwang, were infamous for violence and rape, earning the nickname "ssangdoja" (쌍도자, 雙刀子; meaning “Twin Blades)” by repute. Even his daughter was known for her promiscuity, and her son, appointed as a commander, was equally ruthless.

When the Silla restoration movement by Kim Sami and Hyosim broke out in Gyeongju, Yi sent his son Yi Chisun to suppress them—but instead, Ji-sun colluded with rebels and amassed wealth. Yi, believing in a prophecy that "the dragon's line ends in 12 generations, and then comes the eighteen Sons," interpreted "eighteen" as the character for "Yi (李)" and dreamt of reviving Silla and becoming king. This led to suspicions that he supported the rebellions. General Chŏn Chon'gŏl, the overall commander, was so enraged by the corruption that he committed suicide.

== Death and family's downfall ==
In 1196, Yi Ŭimin's son, Yi Chiyŏng, stole a pigeon from Ch'oe Ch'ungsu, the younger brother of Ch'oe Ch'unghŏn. When Ch'oe Ch'ungsu went to retrieve his birds, he was instead tied up. The angered Ch'oe convinced his older brother, Ch'oe Ch'unghŏn, to overthrow Yi's regime. Yi had turned down King Myeongjong's request to accompany him to Pojesa temple (보제사; 普濟寺) by making an excuse about his ill physical condition and went instead out to a cottage on Mita Mountain. Hearing it, the Ch'oe brothers made their way to the cottage and killed Yi, ambushing him when he came out of the cottage and was about to climb on a horse.

Having successfully carried out the assassination, the Ch'oe brothers immediately head to Kaegyŏng, where they exposed the head of Yi on the street and called up troops with help from general Paek Chonyu (백존유; 白存儒). Hearing the news, King Myeongjong at the Bojesa temple hurried his way back to Kaegyŏng.

Yi's sons Chisun and Chigwang battled against the Ch'oe brothers only to run away in the end after having struggled on the defensive. As they flee, the Ch'oe brothers led their troops to the palace to ask Myeongjong to allow them to put down the remaining insurgents loyal to Yi. With their authority granted by the Myeongjong, the Ch'oe brothers closed up the castle gates to deter fleeing and went on to detain Yi's followers one by one. Notably, many of his key military allies had already died: Cho Wŏnjŏng and Sŏk Rin were executed in 1188 for treason; Paek Imji, Pak Sunp'il, and Yi Yŏngjin died in 1191; Choe Sebo died in 1193. This suggests that the generation of military leaders who led the 1170 coup was fading Meanwhile, they had general Han Hu capture and kill Yi Chiyŏng amid his frolick with Kisaengs.

After this, Ch'oe Ch'unghŏn killed all families and relatives of Yi Ŭimin, and even sent people to every regions of the nation, wiping out all followers and slaves of Yi's. The two surviving sons of Yi Ŭimin, Yi Chisun and Yi Chigwang, returned to Ch'oe Ch'unghŏn to beg for mercy and their pardon, but Ch'oe killed both of them, eradicating the last of Yi's clan.

== Evaluation ==
Unlike predecessors like Yi Ŭibang, Chŏng Chungbu, or Kyŏng Taesŭng, Yi lacked strong family backing or civil service credentials. Still, the core members of Yi’s regime were those who shared his political views, such as Ch'oe Sebo, who rose to second-highest ministerial rank despite being ranked fourth. Mun Kŭkkyŏm (문극겸; 文克謙), who was ahead of Ch'oe in rank, declined promotion, likely due to Ch'oe's political power and close ties to Yi. Choe's son had even committed a crime against the crown prince’s maid, yet Yi protected him. The downfall of Choe's family during Ch'oe Ch'unghŏn's rise suggests that Yi’s influence extended to his allies.

Other key figures included Cho Wŏnjŏng and Chŏng Pang'u, both active participants in the 1170 coup. Yi’s administration expanded the number of top ministers from 7 to 8 in 1190, with most of them being military men involved in the coup:

- Ch'oe Sebo: Specially promoted Minister of State
- Tu Kyŏngsŭng: Minister of Defense
- Yi Ŭimin: Chancellor (Dongjungseomunhapyeongjangsa)
- Pak Sunp'il: Minister of Central Secretariat
- Sa Chŏngyu: Minister of Public Works, Deputy Prime Minister
- Yi Hyŏk'yu: Deputy Prime Minister
- Yi Chimyŏng: Crown Prince’s Tutor
- Paek Imji: Head of State Council

Aside from a few exceptions, most of these were low-born military men who had risen through their own strength, not through family or scholarship. Their rise reflected a new social atmosphere that valued physical power over traditional status.

== Family ==
- Father: Yi Sŏn (이선)
- Mother: Lady Sŏng (성씨)
- Wife: Lady Ch'oe (최씨)
  - Yi Chiyŏng (이지영; ? – 1196), first son
  - Yi Chisun (이지순; ? – 1196), second son
  - Yi Chigwang (이지광; ? – 1196), third son
  - Lady Yi (이씨), first daughter
  - Lady Yi (이씨), second daughter

== In popular culture ==
- Portrayed by Lee Deok-hwa in the 2003–2004 KBS1 TV series Age of Warriors. In this drama he was nicknamed the Geumgang Yacha (金剛夜叉) (Diamond Monster) for his combat prowess and brutality.

Preceded by Kyŏng Taesŭng	Military Leader of Goryeo; 1183–1196	Succeeded by Ch'oe Ch'unghŏn
