= Goryeo military regime =

1170–1270 government in Korea

Goryeo
- Capital: Main : Kaegyŏng; Temporary : Ganghwa (Note: Other name(s): Gangdo (강도; 江都)) (1232–1270)
- Common languages: Middle Korean, Classical Chinese (literary)
- Ethnic groups: Korean
- Religion: Buddhism, Confucianism, Taoism, Shamanism
- Government: Military dictatorship later Hereditary dictatorship
- King
  - 1170–1197: Myeongjong
  - 1259–1274: Wonjong
- Military dictator
  - 1170–1174: Yi Ŭi-bang (first)
  - 1270: Im Yu-mu (last)
- History
  - Military coup d'état: 11 October 1170
  - Ch'oe family regency: 1196–1258
  - Mongol invasions: 1232–1258
  - Sambyeolcho Rebellion: 1270–1273
- Currency: Goryeo coinage
Preceded by	Succeeded by
Goryeo	Goryeo
- Today part of: North Korea; South Korea

Korean name
- Hangul: 무신 정권
- Hanja: 武臣政權
- RR: Musin jeonggwon
- MR: Musin chŏngkwŏn

The Goryeo military regime (Korean: 무신 정권; Hanja: 武臣政權) refers to a period in Goryeo history when military generals wielded considerable power, overshadowing royal authority and disrupting Goryeo's system of civilian supremacy and severe discrimination against military personnel. It spanned roughly 100 years from a coup d'état in 1170 to the Sambyeolcho Rebellion of 1270. The military's despotic rule ended with Goryeo peace treaty with Mongols in 1274.

Goryeosa describes a king, Sinjong, during the military regime that exemplifies the weakened royal authority compared to that of the military ruler:

Sinjong was put upon the throne by Ch'oe Ch'ung-hŏn, and all matters of life and death, decisions to accept or to reject, were in Ch'oe's hands. Sinjong stood above his subjects holding only empty authority. Alas, he was nothing but a puppet.

— Ki-baek Lee, Rule by the Military, A New History of Korea

== Background ==
By the time King Injong (r. 1122–1146) ascended the Goryeo throne as the 17th monarch, the royal authority had significantly weakened and faced serious challenges from powerful factions. Goryeo's elite society was divided into the Kaegyŏng establishment represented by Kim Pusik, relatives of the king represented by Yi Chagyŏm, and an anti-establishment group based in Sŏgyŏng (서경; 西京; lit. western capital), today's Pyongyang, represented by Myocheong, a Buddhist monk and geomancer.

A series of events unfolded that ultimately led to the collapse of royal authority and the rise of military dominance. In 1126, Yi Chagyŏm orchestrated an unsuccessful coup d'etat attempt, during which the royal palace in Goryeo's capital, Kaegyŏng, was consumed by fire. Exploiting the resulting social unrest, Myocheong advised King Injong that the misfortunes originated from Kaegyŏng's feng shui and advocated for relocating the capital to Sŏgyŏng (서경; 西京; lit. western capital), now Pyongyang. This relocation movement sparked a power struggle with the Kaegyŏng establishment and came to a head in Myocheong's rebellion, swiftly quelled by forces under scholar-general Kim Pusik. This victory solidified the influence of scholar-bureaucrat families in the royal court, with no rival faction to check their ambitions. Meanwhile, Goryeo's policies practiced civilian supremacy, discriminating against the military (숭문천무; 崇文賤武; lit. venerate literature; denigrate military). Military officials ranked below civilian officials (or scholar officials) not only politically and economically, but also militarily. Military personnel could not lead military operations, and a scholar-general was appointed among the civilian scholar-bureaucrats instead. Growing resentment among military ranks created a volatile political environment that eventually erupted when aggrieved military officials purged the non-military civilian officials that had long belittled them and seized power.

== Developments ==
After Myocheong's failed attempt to seize power, Kaegyŏng-based establishment, led by Kim Pusik and his supporters, had unchecked power and did as they pleased. One night, during a royal feast, Kim Tonjung, son of Kim Pusik, arrogantly humiliated General Chŏng Chung-bu, by setting his beard on fire with a candle and mocking the military. This incident highlights the bitter relationship between the civilian officials and the military ranks and how the civilian officials of that time viewed the military with contempt. In April 1170, General Chŏng Chung-bu and two of his men decided to rebel while relieving themselves in an outhouse during a royal outing. However, they did not execute the plan immediately and bided their time. Several months after deciding to revolt, Chŏng Chung-bu and his supporters put the plan into action. Goryeosa describes the carnage on the day of Chŏng Chung-bu's rebellion and the days that followed:

In the year of Jeongchuk, the king planned to visit Bohyeonwon. When his majesty arrived in front of the Five Gates, he called his attendants and shared drinks with them. As the feast progressed, he looked around and said, "This place is excellent for practicing warcraft." He then ordered the military officers to perform hand-to-hand combat.

Nightfall descended as the royal procession neared Bohyeonwon. In the dark, Yi Ko (? – 1171) and Yi Ŭi-bang (? – 1174), under the guise of the king's command, assembled the patrol troops. When the king entered the gates of Bohyeonwon and the officials began to disperse, Yi Ko and others killed Im Chŏng-sik (? – 1170), Yi Pok-ki (? – 1170), Han Noe, and others. The king's civil advisors, officials, and loyal eunuchs were not spared the blade. After killing over fifty civil officials in Kaegyŏng, Chŏng Chung-bu (1106–1179) and his associates escorted the king back to the palace.

On the first day of the ninth month, as dusk cloaked the land, the king entered Ganganjeon. Chŏng Chung-bu and his associates then sought out and killed over ten eunuchs and another ten officials who had accompanied the king. At this time, the king sat in Sumunjeon, nonchalantly drinking as musicians played, and did not go to bed until midnight. Yi Ko, Chae Wŏn (? – 1172), and others planned to kill the king, but Yang Suk intervened and stopped them. The patrol troops broke through the windows and walls, stealing treasures from the royal storeroom. Chŏng Chung-bu threatened the king and moved him to the military supply office, while the crown prince was moved to Yeongeungwan.

On the day of Gimyo, the king was exiled alone to Geoje-hyeon, and the crown prince was exiled to Jindo-hyeon. On this day, Chŏng Chung-bu, Yi Ŭi-bang, and Yi Ko led the soldiers and enthroned the king's brother, Prince Ik-yang (Wang Ho). In August of the third year of King Myeongjong's reign (1173), Kim Po-dang (김보당; 金甫當) sent people to bring the king to Gyeongju. On the day of Gyeongshin in October, Yi Ŭi-min (? – 1196) killed the former king by a pond north of Gonwon Temple.

— Book 19 of Kings' Annals, Goryeosa

== Collapse of the regime ==
The military rule came to an end with the sea change in geopolitics and the ascension of King Chungryeol to the Goryeo throne, whose wife was Kublai's daughter. When the tyrannical military rule persisted, Wonjong of Goryeo established a relationship with Kublai before Kublai became emperor and laid the foundation for his son, Chungryeol, to marry a Yuan princess in the future. Once the royal house of Goryeo and the imperial house of the Yuan dynasty became family, power flowed from proximity to the Yuan emperor, and the military regime virtually ended.

After years of Mongolian military campaigns against Goryeo, King Gojong' son, later Wonjong of Goryeo, was on his way back from Mongolia after discussing a truce when Möngke Khan died. Kublai, who was leading a campaign against the Southern Song, started making his way to the Kurultai per Mongolian tradition. While historical sources are unclear about precisely how, Kublai and Wonjong met, likely because their paths crossed. Kublai welcomed Wonjong and said "even Emperor Taizong of Tang couldn't conquer Goryeo, yet here you are—the crown prince; it must bode well." The following month, Kublai defeated Ariq Böke in a civil war, became khan, and proclaimed its khanate Yuan China. In the same month, Wonjong became king of Goryeo.

In the 10th year of King Wonjong's reign, Im Yŏn, a Goryeo general who had seized power, deposed King Wonjong in June 1269. King Wonjong's son (later King Chungryeol) learned of his father's dethronement on his way back to Goryeo from Mongolia, turned around, and came back to Mongolia. Kublai Khan soon became aware of the situation, and Im Yŏn reinstated King Wonjong out of fear of Kublai's reprisals for removing the king of his tributary state without permission.

When King Wonjong went to Mongolia after reinstatement to visit Kublai Khan, King Wonjong asked Kublai to marry one of his daughters to his son. Kublai balked at first but granted King Wonjong his request.

In 1269, the Koryŏ heir apparent (better known later as King Ch'ungnyŏl) requested the hand of a Mongol princess; this act changed the Yuan court's attitude about Koryŏ's loyalty. [...] The Mongol's decision to interpret Ch'ungnyŏl's behavior positively owed much to the larger geopolitical conditions of the empire. Qubilai was still engaged in his mighty conflict with the Chinese Song dynasty. His Chinese ministers, such as Ma Heng (1207–77), counseled that improved relations with Koryŏ would prevent a damaging alliance between the Song and the Koreans. Ma Xiji, another official, also argued that Koryŏ's men and material could be profitably turned to the planned conquest of Japan. Both men held that the Yuan court should seize on Ch'ungnyŏl's apparent change of heart to bind the Koryŏ throne to the Yuan. Renewed war with Koryŏ would prove a dangerous and expensive distraction from the Mongols' strategic aims. Qubilai probably also saw the Koryŏ royal family as a useful check against the powerful Eastern Princes of the Laiodong region. If convinced of the congruence of its interests with those of the Yuan court, the Koryŏ throne would be more inclined to resist the princes' overtures and threats. Finally, in the succession struggle with his brother Ariq Böke, the submission of Koryŏ bolstered Qubilai's credentials as Great Khan and removed it as a potential source of manpower and material to his rival.

— David M. Robinson, Empire's Twilight: Northeast Asia Under the Mongols

Later, King Chungryeol married Kublai Khan's youngest daughter in June 1274.

Goryeo became the Yuan's tributary state and subsequent Goryeo kings were no longer independent rulers. Rather, darughachi was appointed to oversee Goryeo and ensure the Yuan's control, although Kublai had promised the preservation of Goryeo's customs (i.e., 불개토풍; 不改土風). Those who could speak Mongolian or had connections in Yuan China quickly replaced the military as the influential social stratum.

== List of leaders ==
Name	Assumed power	Power ended	Monarch	Notes
Yi Ŭi-bang	1170	1174	Uijong; Myeongjong	Led a successful rebellion against the civilian government and deposed Uijong, installing Myeongjong as a puppet king. Overthrown.
Chŏng Chung-bu	1174	1179	Myeongjong	Participant in 1170 rebellion; ordered the assassination of Yi Ui-bang and assumed personal power. Overthrown.
Kyŏng Tae-sŭng	1179	1183	Myeongjong	Assassinated Chong Chung-bu and his family. Kyong Tae-sung tried to restore the civilian government. But Myeongjong, who regarded him as violating on royal power, hated him. Consequently, Kyong Tae-sung failed to restore the civilian government, but historians of the Joseon period did not consider him as traitor unlike the other military rulers.
Yi Ŭi-min	1183	1196	Myeongjong	Assumed power by request of Myeongjong after Kyong's death. Overthrown.
Regime under the Choe clan
Ch'oe Ch'ung-hŏn	1196	1219	Myeongjong; Sinjong; Huijong; Gangjong; Gojong	Overthrew the governing War Council and assassinated Yi Ui-min. Ch'oe Ch'ung-hŏn thereby established the Ubong Ch'oe Military regime (1196–1258).
Ch'oe U	1219	1249	Gojong	Son of Choe Chung-heon.
Ch'oe Hang	1249	1257	Gojong	Son of Choe U.
Ch'oe Ŭi	1257	1258	Gojong	Son of Ch'oe Hang. Overthrown and Killed by Kim Jun and Yu Gyeong (1211–1289).
Later regimes
Kim Chun	1258	1268	Gojong; Wonjong	Assassinated Choe Ui. Overthrown.
Im Yŏn	1268	1270	Wonjong; Yeongjong; Wonjong	Assassinated Kim Jun. Unsuccessfully attempted to instate a new king.
Im Yu-mu	1270	1270	Wonjong	Son of Im Yeon. Overthrown by Sambyeolcho under direction of the Mongols. End of the military regimes.

== See also ==
- Kamakura shogunate
- Military of the Goryeo Dynasty

== Sources ==
- Lee, Ki-baek (1984). "Chapter 7: Rule by the Military". A New History of Korea. Harvard University Press. ISBN 978-0-674-61576-2.
- Schultz, E. J. (2000). Generals and Scholars: Military Rule in Medieval Korea. University of Hawaii Press. ISBN 978-0-8248-2324-5.
