= Tobang =

Goryeo-era military unit

- Hangul: 도방
- Hanja: 都房
- RR: Dobang
- MR: Tobang

Tobang (Korean: 도방; Hanja: 都房), was a Goryeo Dynasty private military unit that originated as the personal body guard for Kyŏng Taesŭng. After the military revolt of the generals in 1170 during the reign of King Uijong of Goryeo, a series of generals culminating in the Ch'oe military dictators, held the real power in Goryeo. In their first year, General Yi Ko was murdered by General Yi Ŭi-bang who subsequently died at the hands of Chŏng Kyun (정균).

Chŏng's father, Chŏng Chung-bu next held sway for several years until he was overthrown by Kyŏng Taesŭng.

Kyŏng Taesŭng was the next to last general to seize power before the Choe family gained and consolidated military control for a longer period of time. Noting the great personal risk that had plagued the previous generals, Kyŏng Taesŭng organized a personal bodyguard of 100 troops, known as the Tobang, which attended him at all times. The Tobang disbanded upon Kyŏng Taesŭng's death but was reconstituted by Ch'oe Ch'unghŏn shortly after he came to power. Ch'oe expanded the Tobang and divided it into six units (Yuk-bŏn 육번) which became known as the Yuk-bŏn Tobang (육번도방) This enabled a regular rotation of the guards. When Ch'oe U came to power, his private army became known as the Inner Dobang (Nae Tobang, 내도방) and the Outer Tobang (Woe Tobang, 외도방).

== See also ==
- Goryeo
- History of Korea
