= Kyŏng Taesŭng =

Goryeo Military dictator (1154–1183)

Kyŏng Taesŭng 경대승

Military Leader of Goryeo
- In office 1179 – 4 August 1183
- Monarch: Myeongjong of Goryeo
- Preceded by: Chŏng Chungbu
- Succeeded by: Yi Ŭimin

Personal details
- Born: 1154
- Died: 4 August 1183 (aged 28–29)
- Parent: Kyŏng Chin (father)

- Kyŏng Taesŭng
- Hangul: 경대승
- Hanja: 慶大升
- RR: Gyeong Daeseung
- MR: Kyŏng Taesŭng

Kyŏng Taesŭng (Korean: 경대승; Hanja: 慶大升; 1154 – 4 August 1183) was a military official of the mid-Goryeo period who lived from 1154 (the 8th year of King Uijong's reign) to 1183 (the 13th year of King Myeongjong's reign). He became the third dictator of the Goryeo military regime that emerged after the 1170 military coup. At the age of 26, in 1179 (the 9th year of King Myeongjong), he removed the then-powerful Chŏng Chungbu and seized control, ruling for about four years. His rule is often seen as distinct from those of other military rulers before and after him. Unlike other military leaders—Yi Ŭibang, Chŏng Chungbu, Yi Ŭimin, the Ch'oe family rulers, and the final military leaders Kim Chun and Im Yŏn — who appear in the "Rebels" section of the Goryeosa (History of Goryeo), Kyŏng Taesŭng's biography appears in the general biographical section, showing a more favorable evaluation.

== Early life ==
Kyŏng Taesŭng's family origin (bon-gwan) was Cheongju Kyŏng clan in the year 1154. He possessed exceptional physical strength and ambition from an early age, caring little for household affairs. An inscription on the Cheongju Yongdusa Temple Iron Flagpole, established in 962 during King Gwangjong's reign, includes the name Kyŏng Chuhong, a contributor to its construction. This suggests that Kyŏng Taesŭng's family had been local elites (hyangni) in Cheongju since early Goryeo. His father, Kyŏng Chin, was known for his greed, illegally seizing farmland and amassing great wealth.

His family rose to central political prominence by his father Kyŏng Chin's generation. Kyŏng Chin was promoted to the second-highest official rank of chi munhasŏngsa (지문하성사; 知門下省事) shortly after Chŏng Chungbu came to power. According to Kyŏng Taesŭng's biography, his father eventually reached the top rank of vice-director of the Secretariat (중서시랑평장사; 中書侍郎平章事; chungsŏ sirang p'yŏngjangsa), though this may have been a posthumous title.

Through his father's rise, the family formed alliances with other powerful families. Kyŏng Chin married his daughter to General Yi Soŭng, a key figure in the military coup, and took Kim Chun (who later became a top military ruler) as his son-in-law.

Kyŏng Chin had been appointed to this post after the military revolt, but his family had already been a prominent military lineage before the revolt. The extent of their influence is evident in the wide range of marital ties with other military families. For example, Kyŏng Taesŭng's brother was married to Yi Soŭng's daughter—the man who ignited the military revolt—and General Son Sŏk was one of his relatives.

With this background, Kyŏng Taesŭng was appointed at 15 years old to the military rank of lieutenant (교위; 校尉; kyowi) via a protected appointment. This happened in 1168, and just two years later, the military coup occurred. At 17, Kyŏng Taesŭng likely did not participate directly in the coup; there is no record of his actions during this period, making it unclear where he stood. But his father's advancement helped him rise quickly in the military after the revolt. By 1174, he had become a haengsu (military commander), and by 1178, he was promoted to general (changgun), an extremely rapid rise in just ten years. He reportedly harbored resentment toward Chŏng Chungbu's growing power and contemplated assassinating him but held back due to the risks involved.

His rapid rise was likely related to his role as a commander of the royal guards. After the revolt, the political role of the royal guards greatly expanded, and commanding them almost guaranteed political success. His appointment was likely influenced by his father Kyŏng Chin's political clout. Kyŏng Chin, along with Song Kunsu (the son of Song Yu-in, Chŏng Chungbu's son-in-law), held a senior administrative post. This indicates that royal guard commanders were appointed based on political connections. There are even records of high-ranking military officials competing to have their sons appointed to such roles. Therefore, Kyŏng Taesŭng's career was built not on participation in the military revolt but on his prestigious family background.

When his father died, he submitted the land register to the Sŏn'gun (選軍 — a military selection authority or office) and did not take any of it for himself, earning a reputation for integrity and honesty.

In 1174 (4th year of King Myeongjong), the king ordered Kyŏng Taesŭng, then haengsu, and instruction officer (지유; 指諭; chiyu) Yu Kwangyun to play gyeokgu (a traditional polo-like game) and awarded them silk in differing amounts as prizes.

== Coup ==
In 1178 (the 8th year of King Myeongjong's reign), a major incident occurred in Cheongju — a violent conflict between local residents and returnees from Kaegyŏng (the capital). The locals slaughtered most of the newcomers. In response, the Cheongju people residing in the capital recruited a death squad and dispatched them to Cheongju, but they failed, and over 100 were killed. Kyŏng Taesŭng, serving as an inspector general (사심관; 事審官; sasimgwan) with General Pak Sunp'il (박순필; 朴純弼), failed to resolve the conflict and were dismissed from their posts. His resentment toward the regime deepened. Chŏng Chungbu's regime was losing public support. His son Chŏng Kyun tried to marry a princess against the king's will, and his son-in-law, Song Yu-in, demoted respected officials out of jealousy. These events alienated many court officials, prompting Kyŏng Taesŭng to act.

In September 1179, during a night vigil at the Tripiṭaka assembly (장경회; 藏經會; changgyŏnghoe), Kyŏng Taesŭng, and Hŏ Sŭng (허승; 許升) — trusted by Chŏng Kyun — killed him inside the palace. This was the signal for Kyŏng Taesŭng and a 30-man death squad to storm the palace. They killed high officials and others on sight. King Myeongjong was shocked but calmed once Kyŏng explained his intentions. The king even served them wine in support. Kyŏng persuaded the king to dispatch the royal guards, Hŏ Sŭng of the Kyŏllyong army (견룡군; 牽龍軍) and others to arrest Chŏng Chungbu, his son Chŏng Kyun, and Song Yu-in thereby seizing power. They were beheaded and their heads displayed in public.

When congratulated by officials, Kyŏng Taesŭng reportedly replied, "How can I accept congratulations when the regicide is still alive?" — a reference to Yi Ŭimin, who had killed the former King Uijong. This statement was seen as rejecting not only the military regime but perhaps even Myeongjong's legitimacy. When the king suggested appointing a military official as royal transmitter (승선; 承宣; sŭngsŏn), Kyŏng objected, saying only Confucian scholars should fill that role. Thus, from the beginning, Kyŏng Taesŭng presented himself as a restorer of legitimate rule, in contrast to previous military leaders.

=== Causes ===
He had long resented the abuses of Chŏng Chungbu, who had seized power during the military revolt, and sought an opportunity to remove him.

Kyŏng Taesŭng's decision to remove Chŏng Chungbu is said to have been triggered by the impeachment of Mun Kŭkkyŏm (문극겸; 文克謙) and Han Munjun by Song Yu-in. This incident left Song Yu-in unable to escape criticism from the court and government officials. Although Kyŏng Taesŭng had long contemplated removing Chŏng Chungbu, he had hesitated until this opportunity arose. It's only natural that he took advantage of the situation. He likely anticipated that removing Chŏng Chungbu would not put him at a disadvantage and might have expected public opinion and political support to shift in his favor.

Mun Kŭkkyŏm and Han Munjun were both civil officials. Therefore, it is reasonable to infer that those who criticized their demotion and turned against Song Yu-in were mostly fellow civil officials, and that their dissatisfaction played a key role in Chŏng Chungbu's downfall. This situation also raises the question of whether the political influence of the civil officials was still intact at that time. Since high-ranking positions were still largely held by civil officials, this interpretation appears plausible. However, it must also be noted that during Kyŏng Taesŭng's rule, in the 13th year of King Myeongjong's reign, a motion was raised to reduce the number of high-ranking civil posts, indicating that the status of civil officials was under threat. In such a climate, it would have been difficult for them to wield political influence. The fact that civil officials held high positions does not necessarily mean they had actual political power. The key to political influence lies in who truly held power. Thus, the dissatisfaction of civil officials likely was not the decisive factor in Chŏng Chungbu's fall.

Mun Kŭkkyŏm, who was impeached by Song Yu-in, had been appointed by Yi Ŭibang right after the military revolt and had contributed significantly to the establishment of the military regime. He had maintained close ties with military officials for a long time. This suggests that those who were displeased with his impeachment were likely military men rather than civil officials. It may have been precisely because they were military men that they were able to openly show their dissatisfaction toward Song Yu-in, Chŏng Chungbu's son-in-law.

These military men, resentful of Song Yu-in's overreach, may have supported Kyŏng Taesŭng. Even if they did not support him outright, it is clear they did not interfere with his coup. This is evident from the behavior of the Council of Generals (중방; 重房; chungbang) during the coup.

The Council of Generals had emerged as the highest ruling body after the military revolt and handled all major national affairs, including cases of treason. This function remained unchanged during Kyŏng Taesŭng's regime. According to historical records, "King Myeongjong was weak-willed and all state affairs were decided by the generals, while the king merely nodded along." These generals clearly referred to members of the Council.

Considering the role and authority of the Council of Generals, if the majority of high-ranking military officials had been unhappy with Kyŏng Taesŭng's coup, retribution would have followed. However, no such records exist. Of course, there were some military officials who proposed removing Kyŏng Taesŭng, but their opinions were not accepted, indicating they were in the minority. Had the Council of Generals opposed him, his rise to power might not have been possible. In the end, Kyŏng Taesŭng's coup succeeded because he had the cooperation or at least the silent approval of many in the Council of Generals.

== Dictator ==
After becoming the ruling military official, he weakened the Council of Generals, the existing top decision-making body. He continued to influence court decisions, visiting the palace for important matters. Though the king privately feared him, he constantly sent him lavish food, clothing, and treasures. All officials sought his favor, but Kyŏng refused official posts and remained in his private residence. But lacking a solid power base, Kyŏng Taesŭng lived in constant anxiety. Despite having seized power through force, he made efforts to appoint both civil and military officials fairly, which provoked resentment among other military officials and led to frequent conflicts. Though Chŏng Chungbu's faction was eliminated, military officials who had gained power under the regime openly opposed Kyŏng. They argued Chŏng had empowered the military class and that Kyŏng had killed four top officials overnight.

=== Establishing the Tobang ===
He formed a private military force of over 100—called the Tobang — to guard him day and night laying the foundation for maintaining his authority. The Tobang was his personal guard, a first-of-its-kind private force. Its members were mostly "Sasa" (death warriors), including the 30 or so warriors he led during the coup. A record states: "At the time, many thieves roamed the capital, calling themselves members of Kyŏng Taesŭng's Tobang. When officials arrested and jailed them, Kyŏng Taesŭng would release them immediately." This suggests that the Tobang members were effectively criminals disturbing public order. That he organized such individuals into his guard is a serious matter.

These Sasa or "thieves" were likely men who lived off personal martial prowess—unwelcome in peaceful times but thriving in chaos. Their rise was a product of the military revolt, evident from how such terms proliferated post-revolt. This underscores the era's emphasis on individual martial power. The Tobang also included members of the Kyŏllyong army. Kyŏng Taesŭng had Kyŏllyong commander Kim Chagyŏk (김자격; 金子格) oversee the Tobang, indicating that state troops were used as private guards. By organizing this force with death warriors, thugs, and even royal troops, Kyŏng Taesŭng violated the existing legal order. The very formation of a private army represents a rejection of institutional norms—revealing that he, too, was influenced by the post-revolt changes.

According to records, Kyŏng Taesŭng once made long pillows and blankets so his Tobang guards could take shifts sleeping—and even shared a blanket with them to show his sincerity. That someone from a prestigious family, reportedly longing for "restoration," would sleep alongside ruffians is telling. It suggests he knew he could not rely solely on his own authority and had to conform to the new realities of power.

=== Rivalry with Yi Ŭimin ===
Given his noble background, Kyŏng Taesŭng likely could not tolerate such individuals—especially since they had driven the post-revolt changes. Kyŏng Taesŭng also rejected those lacking education or strategy—often men from humble backgrounds who had risen after the revolt. One example is Yi Yŏngjin (이영진; 李英搢), who had once made a living fishing but suffered politically under Kyŏng Taesŭng. Another was Yi Ŭimin, a towering man of humble origins whom Kyŏng Taesŭng declared his intent to eliminate Yi Ŭimin, calling him the king's murderer.

Yi had risen through slaughter during the 1170 coup. When Kyŏng's coup occurred, Yi panicked and fled to his hometown of Gyeongju to gather troops. Later, while serving on the northern frontier, he mistakenly heard that Kyŏng had died and rejoiced, saying, "I meant to kill him but someone did it first!" Kyŏng, upon hearing this, held a grudge, and Yi, fearing for his life, feigned illness and retreated to his hometown, Gyeongju.

Ultimately, though Kyŏng Taesŭng declared his intent to punish Yi Ŭimin, he failed to act. He appeared more passive than aggressive toward his enemies—likely because they had grown too powerful. Even during his regime, men like Ch'oe Sebo and Cho Wŏnjŏng, who shared Yi Ŭimin's political traits, held high office. Thus, his condemnation of Yi Ŭimin as a regicide and rejection of unlearned men reflect his underlying hostility toward the political rise of the lower-class military elite. But power had already begun to tilt toward those who had played active roles in the military revolt.

=== Rebellions ===
Kyŏng became increasingly brutal and insecure during his rule, that he constantly had people patrol the streets. He dispatched agents to monitor rumors and imprisoning and interrogating people even based on them. He even frequently staged purges and using harsh punishments.

During his time in power, lawlessness spread under the Tobang followers, and frequent uprisings occurred, even by close allies like Hŏ Sŭng and Kim Kwangnip (김광립; 金光立) who had helped him and had played major roles in overthrowing Chŏng Chungbu's faction who began to abuse their newfound power, resulting in social disorder. In 1181, when Han Sinch'ung (한신충; 韓信忠), Ch'ae Injŏng (채인정; 蔡仁靖), and Pak Tonsun (박돈순; 朴敦純), who had served as taejŏng (隊正 — a military rank), attempted a rebellion, he exiled them to islands.

== Aftermath ==
Kyŏng Taesŭng died young, at 30. After dreaming of Chŏng Chungbu scolding him with a sword, he fell ill and died—unable to overcome his lasting anxiety about his political enemies. His death brought widespread mourning. Since his rule went against the prevailing trends, harsh measures alone could not change the course of history. After Kyŏng's death, his Tobang was quickly disbanded. Kim Chagyŏk, its commander, accused its members of plotting rebellion. Under torture, many were executed or exiled. Kyŏng's faction was completely destroyed.

Fearing Yi Ŭimin might rebel, King Myeongjong sent envoys to placate him and summoned him to the capital, where he eventually succeeded Kyŏng as military ruler.

=== Legacy ===
A notable fact about Kyŏng Taesŭng is that, among all military rulers after the revolt, he is the only one whose biography is not found in the Goryeosa's "Biographies of Traitors," but rather in the general biographies section. All other military rulers before and after him were recorded as traitors. This decision by the compilers of the Goryeosa likely reflects the positive evaluation of him by civil officials of his time. Clearly, they regarded him as distinct from figures like Yi Ŭibang and Chŏng Chungbu.

If civil officials viewed Kyŏng Taesŭng positively, the military officials likely saw him in a more negative light. The following record reveals his political stance:

"(Kyŏng Taesŭng) always resented the unlawful acts of military officials and longed for a restoration, which made civil officials respect and rely on him."

— (Goryeosa, vol. 12, Annals of King Myeongjong, Year 13, July)

This explains why civil officials respected him. The term "restoration" (復古) here refers to a desire to return to the pre-revolt state. Thus, Kyŏng Taesŭng can be interpreted as someone who rejected the military revolt and the military regime that emerged from it.

Of course, the claim that he held such "restorationist" ideals is likely exaggerated. This was not his own statement but the civil officials' evaluation. It seems they projected their hopes onto him. Still, it's hard to deny that he was dissatisfied with the military revolt and its aftermath.

His disapproval of the military's illegal behavior, which only became possible after the revolt, reveals his discomfort with the resulting societal changes. His resentment of such behavior points to dissatisfaction with the new order.

The Kŏryosa chŏryo (Essentials of Goryeo History) offers this evaluation of Kyŏng Taesŭng:

"He was always indignant at the lawlessness of military officials and sought to restore the old order. Scholars relied on him and held him in high regard. He wanted to punish those who killed King Uijong but remained cautious due to the gravity of the task. When he killed Chŏng Chungbu and Song Yu-in, the king, though wary, favored him outwardly and granted all his requests. Many followed him, but he rejected anyone lacking knowledge, courage, or strategy. Thus, even military officials feared and respected him."

— Kŏryosa chŏryo

This suggests he aimed to restore the pre-military coup order. His actions—returning illegally acquired land, holding Buddhist rites for those killed in the coup and rebellions—reflected this intent. Therefore, scholars respected him, and this favorable view continued into the compilation of the Goryeosa, where his biography was placed in the general section, not the rebels' section. However, lacking a strong political base and facing military opposition, he died young and could not sustain his rule.

== Popular culture ==
- Portrayed by Park Yong-woo in the 2003–2004 KBS TV series Age of Warriors.

== See also ==
- Chŏng Chungbu
- Goryeo

Preceded by Chŏng Chungbu	Military Leader of Goryeo; 1179–1183	Succeeded by Yi Ŭimin
