= Chŏng Chungbu =

Goryeo general (1106–1179)

Military Leader of Goryeo
- In office 1174 – October 18, 1179
- Monarch: Myeongjong of Goryeo
- Preceded by: Yi Ŭibang
- Succeeded by: Kyŏng Taesŭng

Personal details
- Born: 1106
- Died: October 18, 1179 (aged 72–73)
- Children: Chŏng Kyun (son)
- Relatives: Song Yu-in (son-in-law)

Korean name
- Hangul: 정중부
- Hanja: 鄭仲夫
- RR: Jeong Jungbu
- MR: Chŏng Chungbu

Chŏng Chungbu (Korean: 정중부; Hanja: 鄭仲夫; 1106 – October 18, 1179 (Note: In the Korean calendar (lunisolar), he died on the 16th day of the 9th Lunar month of the 9th year of Myeongjong's reign (1179).)) was a medieval Korean soldier and military dictator during the Goryeo period (918–1392). He was a career soldier, qualified on military part of civil service examination. He was most noted for leading a coup d'état in 1170 (Revolt of military officers), dethroning the king and beginning of 100-year military reign in Korea.

== Early career ==
Chŏng Chungbu was from Haeju Chŏng clan. The Haeju Chŏng clan was the clan of Chŏng Chŏngsuk (정정숙; 鄭旌淑), a military official who helped suppress the Myoch'ŏng rebellion and was able to attain civilian offices as a military official. He was said to be over seven feet tall with a dignified, warrior-like appearance. Initially, he was enlisted in the local military registry and sent to the capital of Kaegyŏng, where Minister Ch'oe Hongjae, impressed by his presence, selected him to serve in the Royal Crane Guard (Konghakgun) of the Kŭmgun (Royal Palace Guard). Later, during King Injong's reign, he became commander of the Kyŏllyong army (견룡군; 牽龍軍).

He gained recognition for his military capabilities and served closely under both Kings Injong and Uijong. Favored by King Injong, he served as a close royal guard. He also rose to kyowi (Lieutenant) and eventually rising to Sangjanggun (supreme general), the highest rank attainable for military officers (as there were no first- or second-rank military titles in Goryeo) through various posts.

== Military Coup ==
While at the beginning of the Goryeo dynasty the military officials were on equal standing with the civil officials, the influence of the civil officials grew as the Goryeo government sought to establish a strong central government. Eventually the civil officials led Goryeo's armies as the military commanders, with prominent civil officials such as Kang Kamch'an, Yun Kwan, and Kim Pusik, who held command during times of war and rebellion. The civil domination of Goryeo court meant that the highest position for a military official was that a senior third grade, while civil officials had higher ranked offices. For a military official to advance beyond senior third grade, they had to hold a civil office, which was rare in 11th and 12th century Goryeo.

Civil officials began to discriminate against military officials, with military officials often humiliated by even lower-ranking civil servants. At a New Year's Eve ritual (narye) attended by the king, Chŏng Chungbu himself had his beard singed by the young civil official Kim Tonjung (김돈중; 金敦中), the son of historian Kim Pusik. Another instance, a civil official had his arrow fall near the king's coach during a royal tour. The king believed that the arrow was an assassination attempt by his military officials. The civil official refused to tell the true cause of the matter, letting the innocent military officials to take the blame and to be sent into exile.

Discontent among the military—officers and soldiers alike—was growing, as they were unpaid and overworked. Meanwhile, King Uijong abandoned state affairs, indulging in constant tours and banquets with civil officials, which further enraged the military, who had to endure harsh conditions while serving as guards.

By 1170, lower-ranking officers like Executive Captains Yi Ko and Yi Ŭibang began plotting a rebellion. However, they needed a respected higher-ranking military official to front their movement. They had initially asked Grand General U Hagyu, however, U had refused despite sharing the same grievances as them. With U's refusal to join, the two executive captains turned to Chŏng Chungbu, who agreed to join their cause. On August 30, 1170, the king's entourage moved from Yŏnbokjŏng to Hŭngwangsa Temple and then Pohyŏnwŏn. The three military officers began the revolt killing the accompanying civil officials and eunuchs.

On September 1, Yi Ko and Yi Ŭibang stormed Kaegyŏng and the royal palace and crown prince's palace, killing over 50 civil officials. Chŏng Chungbu remained with the king at Pohyŏnwŏn, calming the more impulsive officers who wanted to kill Uijong and all civil officials.

Eventually, King Uijong was deposed and exiled to Geoje, with the crown prince to Jindo. Prince Ikyang, King Uijong's younger brother, was enthroned as King Myeongjong. Chŏng took over King Uijong's three private residences and enormous wealth, dividing them with Yi Ŭibang and Yi Ko establishing the Goryeo military regime. In the subsequent personnel reshuffle, he was appointed to high civil offices such as Assistant Executive in Political Affairs (참지정사; 參知政事; ch'amji chŏngsa) and later vice-director of the Secretariat (중서시랑평장사; 中書侍郎平章事; chungsŏ sirang p'yŏngjangsa), and awarded First-rank Merit Subject (벽상공신; 壁上功臣; pyŏksang kongsin) for his achievements.

In 1172, appointed Commissioner of Sŏbungmyŏn (서북면; 西北面).

== Establishing the military regime ==
Although the coup is sometimes called “Chŏng Chungbu's Rebellion,” he did not initially become the top figure in the new regime. Instead, power fell to younger officers like Yi Ŭibang, Yi Ko, and Ch'ae Wŏn (채원; 蔡元), who had led the coup with force. These men, who had previously held minor ranks, were suddenly promoted to top military positions and began purging senior officers who disagreed with their brutality.

Soon, internal power struggles emerged. Yi Ko was first to attempt a second coup using monks and gang members but was eliminated by Yi Ŭibang and Ch'ae Wŏn after his plan leaked. Ch'ae Wŏn, in turn, was discovered plotting to assassinate the court and was also removed.

Yi Ŭibang then became the sole power holder. Chŏng Chungbu, wary of being targeted next, kept a low profile. Due to his seniority and status, Yi Ŭibang approached him to form a father-son bond to solidify his power.

Meanwhile, revolts against the military regime erupted. In 1173, Kim Podang (김보당; 金甫當) attempted to restore King Uijong by bringing him to Gyeongju and preparing to march on Kaegyŏng. However, lacking civil official support, the rebellion quickly failed. Captured, Kim Podang declared, “What civil official wasn't in on it?” Yi Ŭibang used this as justification to massacre numerous civil officials but was stopped by Yi Chunŭi and Chin Chun. This event is called “Kyesa Rebellion”, and, along with the 1170 coup, is sometimes collectively referred to as “The Kyŏng-Kye Rebellions.” King Uijong was later executed in Gyeongju by Yi Ŭimin, sent by Yi Ŭibang.

In 1174, another major revolt was led by Cho Wich'ong (조위총; 趙位寵) in Sŏgyŏng (modern Pyongyang). With massive support from the northern populace, the rebellion lasted three years. Yi Ŭibang's regime organized a large suppression force led by Yun Inch'ŏm (윤인첨; 尹鱗瞻), grandson of General Yun Kwan, with Chŏng Chungbu's son Chŏng Kyun and Ki Taksŏng (기탁성; 奇卓誠) as vice commanders. At the same time, civil officials from Sŏgyŏng in the capital were slaughtered to prevent collusion.

During the campaign, Yi Ŭibang further aroused resentment by marrying his daughter to the crown prince. Seeing this as excessive ambition, Chŏng Kyun, persuaded a monk named Chongch'am (종참; 宗旵) to assassinate Yi Ŭibang on January 11, 1175. Yi Ŭibang's brothers and allies were also purged.

With Yi Ŭibang gone, Chŏng Chungbu's rule officially began.

== Reign ==
On January 23, 1175, Chŏng Chungbu was appointed Supreme Chancellor (문하시중; 門下侍中; munha sijung). At age 69, he was joined by moderate figures like Yang Suk, Kyŏng Chin, Ki Taksŏng, and Yi Kwangjŏng, while his son-in-law Song Yu-in, a close confidant, became vice commissioner of the Security Council (추밀원부사; 樞密院副使; ch'umirwŏnpusa).

By 1175, Chŏng had reached the retirement age of 70, but declined to step down after receiving an honorary ceremonial staff (kwejang) and continued to oversee state affairs from the Council of Generals (중방; 重房; chungbang).

However, his regime faced numerous internal and external challenges. Cho Wich'ong 's rebellion dragged on until 1176, when Sŏgyŏng was finally retaken. Meanwhile, in the south, a major uprising broke out in Myeonghakso, Gongju, led by Mangi and Mangso-i, which ended in disaster for the government's suppression troops.

Before it was quelled, other uprisings erupted in Yesan (by Son Ch'ŏng) and Iksan (by a bandit group from Mireuksan). The rebels captured large parts of the southern region, even threatening Yeoju, declaring in a letter: “We would rather die by the sword than surrender. We shall march to the royal capital.”

These uprisings lasted over a year and were eventually put down but severely shook the regime. In Kaegyŏng, plots and dissent followed. Yi Ŭibang's loyalists were caught plotting to assassinate Chŏng and were exiled.

Lower-ranking soldiers also posted anonymous notices accusing Chŏng, his son Chŏng Kyun, and son-in-law Song Yu-in of tyranny, stating that true rebellion stemmed from their abuses, and that they must be dealt with before the southern rebels could be defeated.

In addition to political unrest, the greed of Chŏng and his family drew widespread criticism. After becoming Supreme Chancellor, he seized and amassed vast lands, and owned vast estates. His servants and retainers abused power under his protection. His son Chŏng Kyun illegally occupied and rebuilt the former queen dowager's palace. Song Yu-in seized Sudŏk Palace, once built by King Uijong, for his private residence, living in luxury rivaling royalty.

== Fall ==
In 1178, Chŏng stepped down as Supreme Chancellor at age 73, and Song Yu-in took over. Song further alienated the public by impeaching respected official Mun Kŭkkyŏm (문극겸; 文克謙), worsening public distrust.

In 1179, the regime collapsed in one stroke. Chŏng Kyun, drunk on his own power, sought to marry a princess, shocking the elite. This was the final straw. The young general Kyŏng Taesŭng, in his twenties, launched a coup: he killed Chŏng Kyun, then executed Chŏng's confidants Yi Kyŏngbaek and Mun Kongryŏ, followed by Song Yu-in, his son Song Kunsu, and finally Chŏng Chungbu himself.

Thus, the five-year reign of Chŏng Chungbu came to an end.

== Popular culture ==
- Portrayed by Kim Heung-ki in the 2003–2004 KBS TV series Age of Warriors.

== See also ==
- List of Goryeo people

== Sources ==
- Shultz, Edward J. (2000). Generals and Scholars: Military Rule in Medieval Korea. Honolulu: University of Hawai'i Press. ISBN 0-8248-2324-9. S. 70–82

Preceded by Yi Ŭibang	Military Leader of Goryeo; 1174–1179	Succeeded by Kyŏng Tae-sŭng
