= Silla restoration movement =

12th-century uprisings in Korea

- Hangul: 신라 부흥 운동
- Hanja: 新羅復興運動
- RR: Silla buheung undong
- MR: Silla puhŭng undong

The Silla restoration movement refers to a series of uprisings in Yeongnam province of Korea during the middle Goryeo dynasty in the 12th century. These were part of a pattern of revolts aimed at restoring Silla, one of the old Three Kingdoms of Korea, which had been destroyed by Goryeo. Silla restoration revolts include those led by Yi Ŭimin in 1186 and by Kim Sami in 1193 as well as later revolts in 1202.

== The Revival Movement of Yi Ŭimin and Kim Sami ==
Even after nearly three centuries of Goryeo rule, loyalty to the old Silla kingdom and Silla traditions remained latent in the Kyŏngju area. Yi Ŭimin launched his rebellion in 1186 with the intent to overthrow Goryeo's rule and restore Silla, but was defeated. His son and associated Kim Sa-Mi, reiterating Yi Ŭimin's ploys, launched a rebellion in 1193 and his rebels claimed: "The Koryŏ mandate is completely exhausted. Silla must be restored." Kim Sami's rebellion was defeated in 1194 at the Battle of Milsong, where more than 7,000 rebels were killed.

== 1202 Sillan Revival Movement ==
In 1202, soldiers, monks, and peasants at Kyŏngju, Ch'ŏngdo, Ulchin, and Ulsan also revolted with the battle cry of reviving old Silla, engaging in fierce battles with government forces for some two years. The 1202 movement began when the local gentry of Gyeongju, aiming to revive Silla, selected Seok Seong-ju to serve as king of their rebellion, and subsequently attempted to reclaim the region south of the Han River. According to Korean historians, it appears they did not intend to overthrow Goryeo, but rather focused on recovering the former Silla territory south of the Han River. However, this attempt failed when Seok reported this plot to the Goryeo government.

Though the local gentry surrendered, Goryeo General Choe Chung-heon dispatched troops to the Gyeongju region. Consequently, the subsequent peasant uprisings appear to have gradually spread as they resisted the government's suppression operations. As a result the uprising of the people of Gyeongju took on a stronger character of peasant resistance rather than the Silla restoration plot led by the gentry. Despite this, there were hardliners within the Gyeongju gentry who refused to surrender and continued in their attempts to restore Silla and fought alongside the peasants of Gyeongju against Goryeo.

== See also ==
- History of Korea
- Military history of Korea
- Later Three Kingdoms of Korea
