= Kim Pusik =

Korean scholar and general (1075–1151)

- Hangul: 김부식
- Hanja: 金富軾
- RR: Gim Busik
- MR: Kim Pusik

Art name
- Hangul: 뇌천
- Hanja: 雷川
- RR: Noecheon
- MR: Noech'ŏn

Courtesy name
- Hangul: 입지
- Hanja: 立之
- RR: Ipji
- MR: Ipchi

Posthumous name
- Hangul: 문열
- Hanja: 文烈
- RR: Munyeol
- MR: Munyŏl

Kim Pusik (Korean: 김부식; Hanja: 金富軾; 1075–1151) was a Korean calligrapher, military general, philosopher, poet, historian, and politician during the Goryeo period. He was a scion of the Silla royalty and a member of the Gyeongju Kim clan. Later he was the supreme chancellor from 1136 to 1142 and was in charge of the suppression of the Myoch'ŏng rebellion. Kim is best known for supervising the compilation of the Samguk sagi, the oldest extant written Korean history.

== Early life and background ==
The Gyeongju Kim clan was a direct descendant of the last Silla king, Kim Pu. The clan seat (bongwan) name derives from Kim's great grandfather, a member of the royal Kim clan, who became the administrator in charge of the former Silla capital (renamed Gyeongju at the beginning of the Goryeo period). The first Goryeo king Taejo married into the Gyeongju Kim, and the clan played a leading role in early Goryeo politics. Three of its members were the officials of the first and second rank during 981-1069.

Kim's father, Kim Kun, was an official (reached the junior 3rd rank) and a famous poet. When he was a member of an embassy to the Song court, he and the fellow envoy Pak Illyang published a collection of poems that made a deep impression on Song scholars. "The allusions in the poems were so intricate that the most renowned court scholars had to study them in detail before being able to understand them."

The oldest son Kim Pup'il (? -?) reached the senior 5th rank in 1102, but these were the three younger sons, Kim Puil (1071–1132), Kim Pusik, and Kim Puch'ŏl, also known as Kim Puŭi, (1079–1136) that played an important role in politics and culture of Goryeo. Kim Kun died when Kim Pusik was about thirteen, and his widow raised and supervised the education of her younger sons. Later King Yejong rewarded her with a yearly allowance, noting in particular her merit in assisting each of her sons to pass the state examination.

== Career ==
=== Early career, 1096–1122 ===
Kim himself passed the civil service examination in 1096 on the Book of Documents and was appointed as an official in the Anseo prefecture. Subsequently he was selected for a position at the Hallimwon (Academy of Letters), that was also responsible for drafting foreign correspondence. The Kim brothers steadily raised through the ranks of the civil service. In 1115, Kim Pusik was appointed to the Office of Remonstrance. Despite their relatively junior ranks, both Kim Pusik (senior 6th rank) and Kim Puil (junior 5th rank) participated in the meetings of the Privy Council (Chae Chu).

The increasing literary and scholarly reputation of the Kim brothers made them popular teachers of the Confucian classics. In 1116, King Yejong instituted the royal lecture (kyeongyeon) by designating a lecture hall and making a number of appointments to the position of a royal lecturer. Under him and his successor Injong the lectures were held regularly. Such a lecture was a Confucian ritual in which the ruler paid homage to Confucian teachings. Many of the royal lecturers belonged to the Han An-in faction that opposed Yi Cha-gyŏm. Both Kim Puch'ŏl and Kim Pusik delivered royal lectures, expounding the teachings of Confucius and Mencius. Kim Pusik lectured on the Book of History and the Book of Changes.

These lectures became a scene of rivalry between Kim Pusik and Yun Ŏn-i (윤언이; 尹彦頤), son of the famous general Yun Kwan. Yun was an influential Confucian scholar and a future supporter of the Pyongyang faction and Myoch'ŏng. His attacks on Kim may have roots in Yun Kwan's fall and disgrace (1108–1109) that was at least partially precipitated by the court machinations, or in an incident when Kim Pusik rewrote a memorial plaque written by the general. During Kim's lessons on various historical topics Yun Ŏn-i posed difficult questions, apparently trying to embarrass him and discredit his scholarship. After 1121 Kim Pusik was appointed as Royal Diarist, or ji, to the court of Yejong. By 1122 Kim Pusik became an executive at the Ministry of Rites (Yebu Sirang), typically an appointment of the 3rd junior rank.

=== Role in the foreign policy, 1114–1122 ===
The years 1114–1128 saw a major change in the balance of power in North-East Asia. Around the year 1100 the dominant regional power was the Khitan state of Liao. Emperors of Liao and of Song China were officially considered equals. However, Song had to pay an annual tribute (that was not named as such) of 200,000 taels of silver and 300,000 bolts of silk, that was equivalent to several percent of the Song government revenues. Goryeo was a tributary of Liao, even if the tribute was not paid after 1054. Jurchen tribes were vassals of Liao, that exercised a variable degree of control over their tribal groupings. Jurchen had complicated relationships with Goryeo. These ranged from a tributary status and mercenary service to cross-border warfare and informal alliances, particularly during the reign of King Yejong.

Basic tenets of Goryeo's political theory were expressed in the Ten Injunctions of Taejo. This document advised a cautious following of the Chinese practices, and expressed abhorrence of Khitan, and by extension, other nomadic "barbarians". The status of Goryeo rulers can be roughly summarized as naeje oewang (emperor at home and king abroad). They were titled kings, were tributaries of Khitan Liao dynasty, and were careful to keep these conventions in the correspondence with the suzerains. On the other hand, many aspects of the government were fashioned after following the imperial conventions. A majority view of the scholars-officials, including the Kim brothers, was that Goryeo was a realm in itself and thus "a possible center of the world". During this period Kim Pusik drafted a significant portion of the diplomatic correspondence with both Liao and Song.

Throughout their careers Kim brothers demonstrated a pragmatic approach both domestically and internationally. At the beginning of the century the Liao dynasty appeared strong and Kim Puil congratulated Emperor Tianzuo of Liao as a ruler who "developed and enlarged [his] territory and made both Chinese and barbarians follow [him] peacefully." In a letter to the Song court Kim Pusik derived the Goryeo legitimacy as successors of Jizi (Giji, a semi-legendary sage who is said to have ruled Gojoseon in the 11th century BCE), who was enfeoffed by the Chinese Son of Heaven. After a long and mutually complementary discourse Pusik "concluded by stating that it was the barbarians who stood between Goryeo and the Song, literally and figuratively." This letter was written just before Kim Pusik finally ensured the recognition by Goryeo of the Jin dynasty ruler as the Son of Heaven in 1126.

Jurchen leader Wanyan Aguda started a successful rebellion against Liao in 1114. While a majority of the Goryeo officials were anti-Jurchen, both the king's father-in-law Yi Cha-gyŏm and Kim Pusik aimed to keep Goryeo out of the fray and benefit from the changing geopolitical situation. For example, the first Liao request for help was debated (8th month of the 10th year of Yejong's reign, July 1115) at the extended meeting of the Privy Council that included also the top military commanders. The majority of officials supported sending the troops. The opposition was voiced by a relatively junior associate of Yi Cha-gyŏm and by Kim Puil and Kim Pusik, who argued that `sending troops for another country could be the cause of trouble and would undoubtedly be dangerous for the future'. They succeeded in stalling the motion. At approximately the same time Kim Pusik acknowledged the increasing strength of the Jurchen in the official letters to the Liao court, but swore that Goryeo was loyal to Liao; if not, "may the gods destroy it".

Wanyan Aguda scored a number of victories over Liao; and proclaimed the establishment of the Jin dynasty with himself as its first emperor in 1115. In 1116–1117, Kim Pusik was part of the embassy to the Song court. Goryeo consistently refused any military help to Liao and in the wake of the Jurchen advances recaptured the Uiju (Poju) area and once again established the Yalu River as its border. While the majority of Yenjong's officials believed in the eventual Liao downfall, a crisis in the relationship with the Jurchen was precipitated by the request of Taizu of Jin to be recognized as the 'elder brother' of the Goryeo king in 1117. A majority of the officials opposed this request and even considered beheading the envoy. The factions of Yi Cha-gyŏm and Kim Pusik stalled the rash moves, but the formal submission of Goryeo to Jin was made only during the reign of Injong.

In fact, Kim Puch'ŏl (voicing a position of Kim Pusik who was at the time in China) submitted a memorandum proposing to accede to the demands of Emperor Taizu of Jin, giving the following rational: "Now even the great Song calls itself the younger brother of the Khitan and they have gotten along peacefully for generations. And although there is nothing under heaven that can measure up to the dignity of the Son of Heaven [of Goryeo], submitting to and obeying the barbarians like this is the proper policy, one that the sages called 'the temporarily putting aside of one's principles as circumstances demand it' and 'the protection of the whole country.'" Later Kim Pusik himself provided an example of temporizing in the correspondence with the Jin, arguing why Goryeo cannot be its vassal.

In his book Gaoli tujing Xu Jing (1091–1153), a member of the Song mission to Goryeo in 1122–1123, mentions Kim Pusik.

=== Reign of Injong (1122–1146) ===
Early years of the reign of Injong (1122–1126) were dominated by Yi Cha-gyŏm, his maternal grandfather. Shortly after Injong took the throne, Kim was an executive, and in 1124 was promoted to the position of the deputy minister of the Ministry of Rites (예부시랑; 禮部侍郞; yebu sirang) . Using his position Kim opposed Yi Cha-gyŏm hold on power, aiming at Yi's attempts to enhance his public image. Already in 1122 Kim argued against giving special recognition to Yi Cha-gyŏm as king's grandfather. Later he questioned the appropriateness of calling Yi's birthday Insujel (Celebrating Humaneness and Longevity), and a planned performance of the ritual music at the Yi's family graves. Nevertheless, after a failed coup against Yi in early 1126 Kim Pusik not only remained in power, but was promoted to the position of the Chief Censor.

The role of Kim Pusik in toppling Yi Cha-gyŏm is unknown. Kim Puil, on the other hand, was one of the intermediaries between Injong and Yi's military supporters, inducing them to defect.

After 1126 the Kim brothers advanced through the Security Council into the highest offices.

In 1135–1136 Kim Pusik was in charge of suppressing the rebellion of Myoch'ŏng and rooting out his adherents in Kaesong. He became the supreme chancellor in 1136 and dominated the Goryeo government till his official retirement in 1142.

In 1142, Injong ordered the compilation of the Samguk Sagi, a chronicle of events in the Three Kingdoms and Unified Silla. Using Chinese histories (particularly Shiji by Sima Qian), Kim Pusik at the head of the fourteen-author team compiled the oldest extant source on Korean history. It was submitted to Injong in late 1145 or early 1146.

== Religion ==
The ideological and religious opinions of Kim Pusik fell into the spectrum of practices of the upper strata of the Goryeo society. Confucianism was primarily a state ideology, aimed at social cohesion and state administration. Kim was one of the most prominent Confucian scholars of his time.

By the twelfth century Buddhism was a religion of both elites and common people. It enjoyed royal and aristocratic patronage and the Buddhist hierarchy was integrated into the state bureaucracy. Kim Pusik was a practicing Buddhist. He established a family temple complex Kwallan-sa. This temple also inspired Kim's poem At Kwallan. Kim is an author of the inscription honoring a Buddhist monk Ŭich'ŏn (the son of King Munjong and the National Preceptor, one of the three highest Buddhist hierarchs of the country). There he recalls their only meeting, when as a boy he visited his brother in a monastery. In retirement Kim became a lay monk (keosa).

Worship of native spirits and guardian spirits (animism) was widely practiced by populace and part of the royal rituals prescribed by the Ten Injunctions of Taejo. During the 1135–1136 Myoch'ŏng rebellion, Kim Pusik is recorded as swearing an oath "by the heaven and the earth, the mountains and streams and the gods and spirits". He made a sacrifice to the guardian deities of the Western Capital following its capture from the rebels.

== Family ==
- Father: Kim Kŭn (김근; 金覲)
  - Grandfather: Kim Wŏnch'ung (김원충; 金元冲)
    - Older brother: Kim Pup'il (김부필; 金富弼)
    - Older brother: Kim Puil (김부일, 金副佾; 1071–1123)
    - Younger brother: Kim Puŭi (김부의; 金副儀)
- Unnamed wife
  - 1st son: Kim Tonjung (김돈중, 金敦中; 1119–1170)
    - Grandson: Kim Kunsu (김군수; 金君綏)
  - 2nd son: Kim Tonsi (김돈시, 金敦時; d. 1170)

== Sources ==
- Breuker, Remco E. (2010). Establishing a Pluralist Society in Medieval Korea, 918–1170: History, Ideology and Identity in the Koryŏ Dynasty. BRILL. doi:10.1163/ej.9789004183254.i-484. ISBN 978-90-04-18325-4.
- Seth, Michael J. (2011). A History of Korea: From Antiquity to the Present. Rowman & Littlefield. ISBN 978-0-7425-6715-3.
