= Myoch'ŏng =

Korean Buddhist monk (12th century)

Myoch'ŏng (Korean: 묘청; Hanja: 妙淸) was a Korean Buddhist monk, rebel and geomancer of the royal court of the Goryeo dynasty.

== Myoch'ŏng's Rebellion ==
During the reign of King Injong of Goryeo, Myoch'ŏng argued that Goryeo had become weakened by Confucian ideals. His views directly conflicted with those of the predominant neo-Confucian court officials, represented by Kim Pusik. On a broader scale, this represented the ongoing struggle between the Confucian and Buddhist elements and factions in Goryeo royal court.

It was during this period that the Jin dynasty of China was exerting pressure on Goryeo. The trouble with the Jin dynasty was partly due to Goryeo's underestimation of the newly established state and the ill-treatment of its envoys (i.e. killing them and humiliating their corpses). Goryeo belittled and refused to engage with the Jurchens, because the Jurchens were once a subservient tribe under Goryeo's predecessor state Goguryeo, and therefore, Jurchen assertion of equality with Goryeo offended Goryeo.

Taking advantage of the situation, Myoch'ŏng proposed attacking the Jin dynasty and claimed that moving Goryeo's capital to Sŏgyŏng, currently Pyongyang, would assure success. King Injong was persuaded. However, the rest of the royal court and bureaucracy did not support the move, and the king had to backtrack on his commitments to Myoch'ŏng. Frustrated at the resistance of the southern elites (who feared losing their dominant position) against moving the capital to the former Goguryeo capital and reclaiming former Goguryeo lands in Manchuria, Myoch'ŏng led a rebellion against the Goryeo government and formed a breakaway regime. He established in Pyongyang, known as Sŏgyŏng (서경; 西京; lit. 'Western Capital') at the time, his new state of Daewi (대위; 大為). According to Myoch'ŏng, the Goryeo capital of Kaegyŏng was "depleted of virtue." This made Sŏgyŏng the ideal location for the supposed dynastic revival.

The rebellion was crushed by forces led by scholar-general Kim Pusik.

== See also ==
- History of Korea
- Goryeo
- Shin Chaeho
