= Protected appointments system for hereditary privileges in Asia =

In the East Asian cultural sphere, a protected appointments system for hereditary privileges historically existed to select candidates for state bureaucracy based on their families. Originated in China, the system was one of the systems to select candidates for state bureaucracies besides imperial examinations.

== Local varieties ==
=== China ===
The yinbuzhi (Chinese: 蔭補制) existed in the Tang dynasty and Song dynasty.

=== Korea ===
Ŭmsŏ (Korean: 음서; Hanja: 蔭敍) was a system of the Goryeo dynasty that determined the suitability of the candidate based on their family backgrounds.There were four attested types of ŭmsŏ found in records.

=== Japan ===
On-i (Japanese: 蔭位) was such a system for Japan that was adopted following the adoption of the Taihō Code in 701, and was allowed for Royal descendants and descendants of offices higher up.

=== Ryukyu ===
Ryukyu's kage (蔭) is mentioned as one of the political positions in Ryukyu who wore attire appropriate for 8th class subordinates).
