= Yi Ko =

Korean military leader (fl. 12th century)

- Hangul: 이고
- Hanja: 李高
- RR: I Go
- MR: I Ko

Yi Ko (Korean: 이고; Hanja: 李高; ?–1171) was a military ruler in Korea. During the reign of King Uijong, when the Mushin Rebellion occurred, widespread dissatisfaction had grown among military officials, soldiers, and even common farmers due to the contradictions within the socio-economic system of early Goryeo.

In 1170 (24th year of King Uijong's reign), when the king made a royal procession to Hwapyeongjae (和平齋), Yi Ko, who held the rank of Sanwon (a minor court official), expressed his intention to stage an uprising to General Chŏng Chungbu, together with Yi Ŭibang. He gained Chŏng’s agreement.

However, they did not carry out the uprising at Hwapyeongjae. Later, they planned that if the king moved from Yeonbokjeong (延福亭) to Bohyeonwon (普賢院) in Jangdan, Gyeonggi Province, instead of returning to the palace, they would launch the revolt. They made this agreement with Chŏng Chungbu.

As fate would have it, the king’s procession did move to Bohyeonwon. At the Five Gates (오문), the king, intending to appease the military officials, ordered a hand-to-hand combat performance (오병수박희). When General Yi So-eung (이소응) lost and fled from the match, a young civil official, Han Rae (한뢰), struck him in the face, knocking him down the stairs. Witnessing this, Yi Ko drew his sword in fury, intending to begin the rebellion immediately, but was dissuaded by Chŏng Chungbu.

As evening fell and the royal carriage passed through the gates, the rebellion was launched. Yi Ko and his allies killed all the civil officials who had accompanied the king and stormed the palace and the Crown Prince’s residence, killing over 50 civil officials. The king, gripped by fear, appointed Yi Ko as Jungnangjang (中郞將), a middle-ranking commander of the Royal Dragon and Tiger Guard (응양용호군 鷹揚龍虎軍). However, Yi Ko soon joined Chŏng Chungbu and Yi Ŭibang in deposing King Uijong, installing King Myeongjong, and establishing the Goryeo military regime. The three of them divided up King Uijong’s former residences: Gwanbuk Residence (館北宅), Cheondong Residence (泉洞宅), and Gwakjeongdong Residence (藿井洞宅).

Yi Ko was later appointed Daeganggun ((대장군; 大將軍), Grand General) and Wiwigyŏng (위위경; 衛尉卿), Minister of the Guards), and concurrently held the office of Chipju (執奏, a role combining administrative and military authority) with Yi Ŭibang. He was honored as a Pyeoksanggongsin (壁上功臣, "Meritorious Subject Painted on the Wall") and had his portrait drawn and placed in the royal hall.

Yi Ko, along with Chŏng Chungbu and Yi Ŭibang, advocated for mass executions of civil officials. However, Chŏng Chungbu prevented this plan from going forward.

In 1171, when Grand General Han Sun (한순) and Generals Han Kong (한공), Sin Taeye (신대예), Sa Chikchae (사직재), and Ch'a Chunggyu (차중규) criticized the military for arbitrarily killing civil officials, Yi Ko and Yi Ŭibang had all of them executed—except for Ch'a Chunggyu, who had a personal friendship with Yi Ŭibang and was thus spared and exiled to a distant province.

Attempting to consolidate power for himself, Yi Go secretly conspired with a group of ruffians (akso, 惡少), the monk Suhye (修惠) from Beopunsa Temple (法雲寺), and the monk Hyeonso (玄素) from Gaeguksa Temple (開國寺). They drank heavily and Yi Ko promised, “If we succeed in this great plan, you will all receive high positions.” He even forged a royal edict (chesŏ, 制書), which drew the suspicion and hatred of Yi Ŭibang. When the Crown Prince was to perform his coming-of-age ceremony (관례, 冠禮), the king held a banquet at Yeojeong Palace (麗正宮). Yi Ko, acting as Seonhwasa (宣花使, Master of Ceremonies), participated in the banquet. He instructed Hyeonso to gather the ruffians in Suhye’s room at the temple, serve them wine, and conceal weapons in their sleeves to start the rebellion. However, this plan was exposed when the son of Yi Ko’s subordinate (kusa, 驅使), Captain Kim Taeyong (김대용), informed his father. Kim Dae-yong then reported it to Naesijanggun (內侍將軍, Commander of the Royal Guards), Ch'ae Wŏn (채원).

As a result, Yi Ŭibang, who already despised Yi Ko, waited outside the palace gates and killed him with an iron mace. The royal guards were dispatched to arrest and execute Yi Ko’s mother and his remaining followers. Yi Ko’s father, who had long considered his son a disgrace and disowned him, was spared and merely exiled.

== Popular culture ==
- Portrayed Park Jun-gyu in the 2003–2004 KBS TV series Age of Warriors.

== See also ==
- List of Goryeo people
- Goryeo
