= Dragon's head and wind chime =

Silla/Goryeo–era sculpture

Rafter finial in the shape of a dragon's head and wind chime
- 금동 용머리 모양 처마 끝 장식과 작은 종 고려 (Korean)
- Year: 10th century AD (early Goryeo dynasty)
- Type: Sculpture
- Medium: Gilt bronze
- Location: Metropolitan Museum of Art, New York
- Accession: 1999.263a, b

chime, Metropolitan Museum of Art.

finial in the shape of dragon's head, Metropolitan Museum of Art.

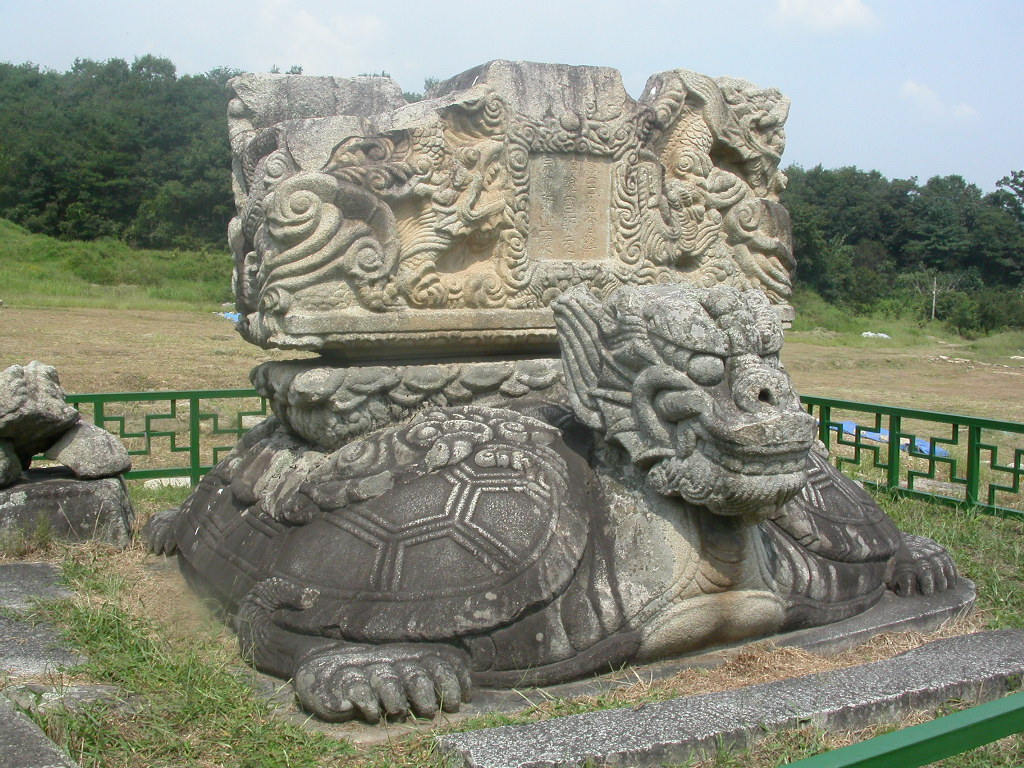
Monument at Godal Temple, showing dragon-tortoise hybrid.

The dragon's head and wind chime is an elaborate type of gilt bronze Korean wind chime and Korean dragon sculpture of later Silla / early Goryeo art, probably serving as a roof end tile figure on a Korean Buddhist temple or Korean palace. There are two similar near-complete examples, at the Metropolitan Museum of Art in New York City, and at Leeum, Samsung Museum of Art in Seoul, which is designated National Treasure No. 781.

Belonging to the 10th century AD, this work would originally have been attached to a corner rafter of a royal palace building or a Buddhist temple hall. The artifact, made of guilt bronze consists of two major parts: the lower wind chime and upper rafter finial with the shape of a dragon head. The dragon head contains various intricate designs and its eyes, closed mouth, horns, ears and elaborate scales convey the fierceness of the mythical creature. A hook in the upper part of the chime might have used to hang the chime in the rafter, as loops can be seen in the chin of the dragon head. The lower part of the wind chime contains decorative panels of a circular platform with lotus motifs in either side. A swastika symbol can be observed in the middle of the platform. This is considered as an ancient symbol related with Buddha. As the dragon is considered as a symbol of protection and fierceness in Asian tradition, it is speculated that this chime would have attached as a roof end tile figure to a royal palace or a Buddhist temple hall. Dragon finials are significant in Korean art. The dragon face resembles that at Godal Temple, which is dated to 975.

== Introduction ==
Korean Peninsula has a long history of art. The Korean pottery shows advanced techniques and elaborate jewelry has been found buried in ancient Korean tombs. From 7th to 17th century AD, metal crafting was developed and fine metal works can be observed. Also Korean porcelain and painting was developed with its distinctive style. This Rafter finial in the shape of a dragon's head and wind chime is one of the finest metal works of Goryeo period. In the Korean art and culture, dragon figure holds a significant place. Specially, dragon is considered as the protector of humans as well as warding off evil spirits. This figure, displaying the fierceness of a dragon, shows how advanced metal work Goryeo craftsmen had. The bell, which functioned as a punggyeong (Korean: 풍경, lit. 'wind bell'), originally had a metal-plated clapped inside. Another similar example for the dragon's head and wind chime set can be seen at Leeum, Samsung Museum of Art, Seoul, and the dragon's head element is designated National Treasure No. 781.

== See also ==
- Wind chime
