= Korean wind chime =

Korean temple wind bell

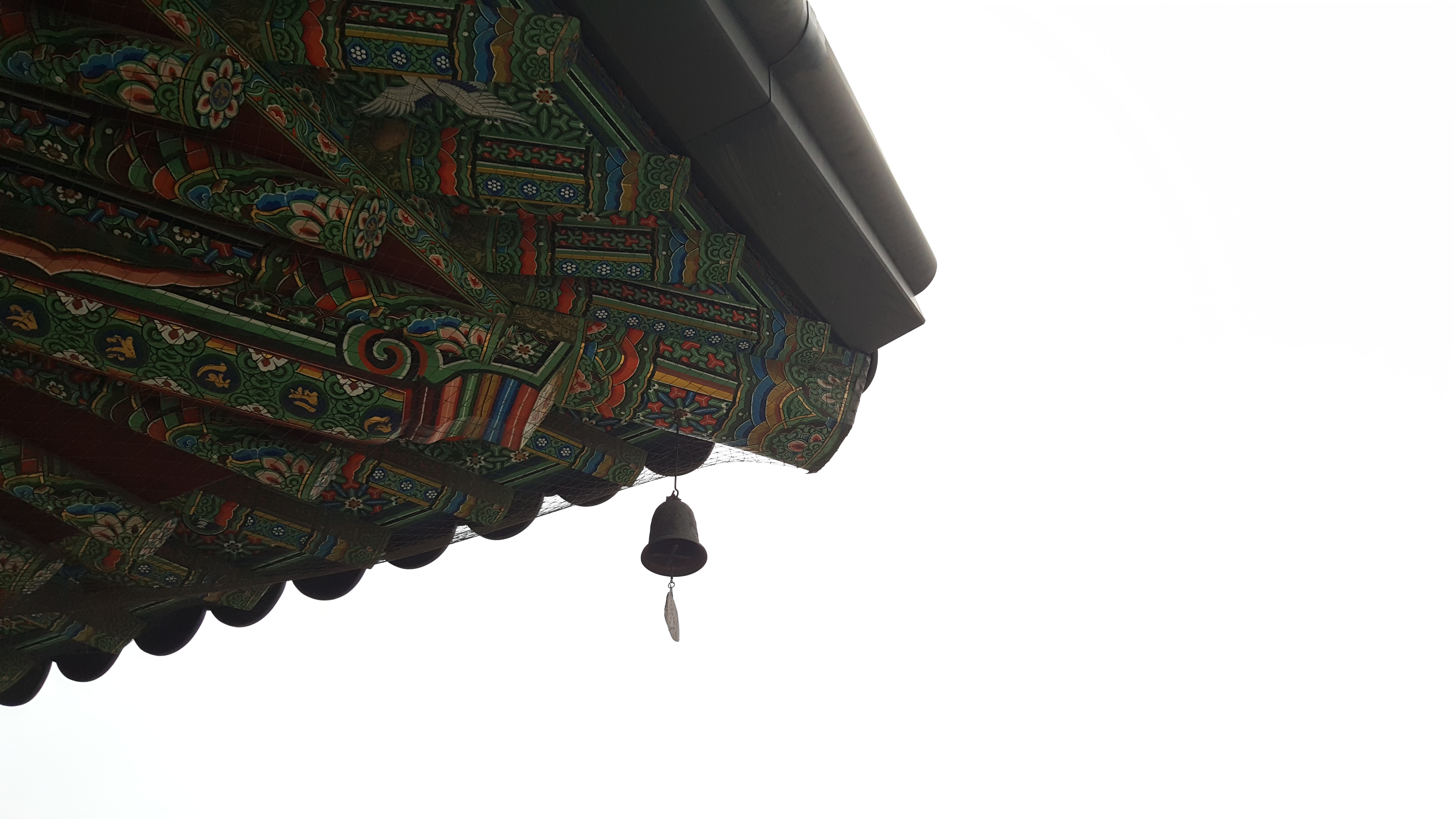
A wind chime at Bongeunsa, with fish decoration.

Dragon's head with bell, Metropolitan Museum of Art.

Korean wind chimes (Korean: 풍경, romanized: punggyeong, lit. 'wind bell') are various traditional bells hung from the exterior corners of Korean Buddhist temples, and functioning as a wind chime. The bell's clapper is often in the shape of a fish, an auspicious sign in Buddhism.

An elaborate gilt bronze style of Korean wind chime and dragon's head finial became a type of object in later Silla / early Goryeo art.

Hung from the eaves, and rung by the wind, it is a form of awakening practitioners of Buddhism to the external world.

== See also ==
- Wooden fish
