= Korean palace =

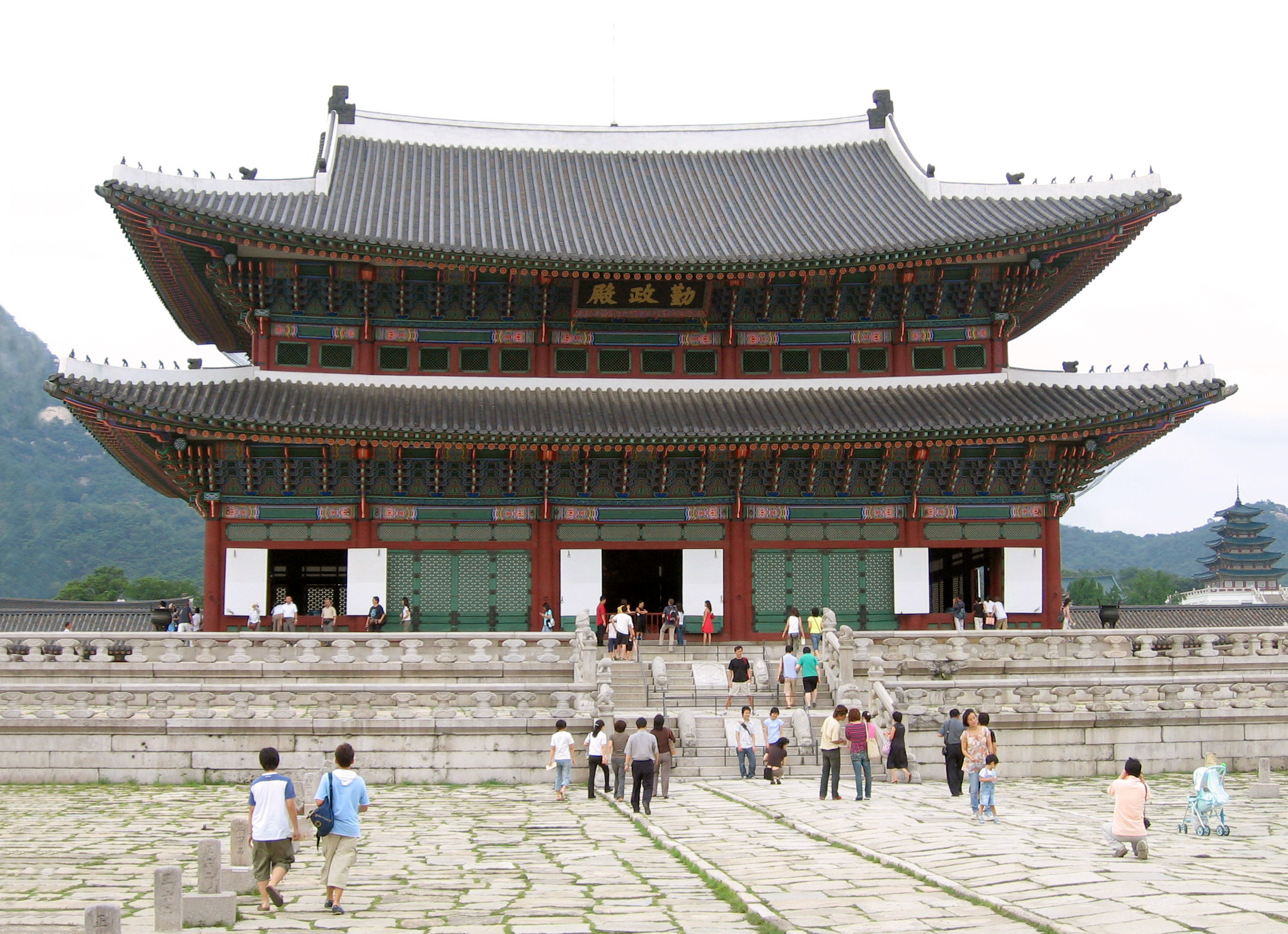
Gyeongbokgung, the primary palace of the Joseon Dynasty in Korea.

There are a number of palaces in various places in Korea that have been built over the course of several thousand years and several historical monarchies. Many have survived into the present. Some have been destroyed and have since never been rebuilt. And some, such as Gyeongbokgung, have been rebuilt after being destroyed.

== History ==
Although the palaces of Korea were constructed following ancient Chinese principles, the style they followed was from Chinese Song Dynasty style. With green and red color choice and same artistic choices which was adopted during Goryeo Dynasty from China.

The kingdoms in Korean history built capital cities and palaces starting from 1 BC, but many of their exact forms remain unknown. The palaces of Gojoseon (2333–250 BC) cannot be traced at all. The palaces of the Three Kingdoms can be imagined, mainly from some historical records and sites. The palace of Goguryeo was Anhak Palace, constructed after the capital moved to Pyeongyang, causing a need for a new palace. Thus, in 427 AD, Anhak palace was built. Baekje maintained palaces in Sabi (modern-day Buyeo) and Gongju. Silla had its palace, known as the Banwolseong, within Gyeongju. The Palace of Balhae was said to be Sanggyeong Palace, and was one of the largest palaces in Korean history.

The earliest evidence that shows the concrete Korean architectural style can be explored from the architecture of Gaegyeong, the capital of Goryeo Dynasty. Another palace of Goryeo was Manwoldae.

During the Joseon dynasty, there were eight palaces built, of which Gyeongbokgung, Changdeokgung, Changgyeonggung, Deoksugung, and Gyeonghuigung remain.

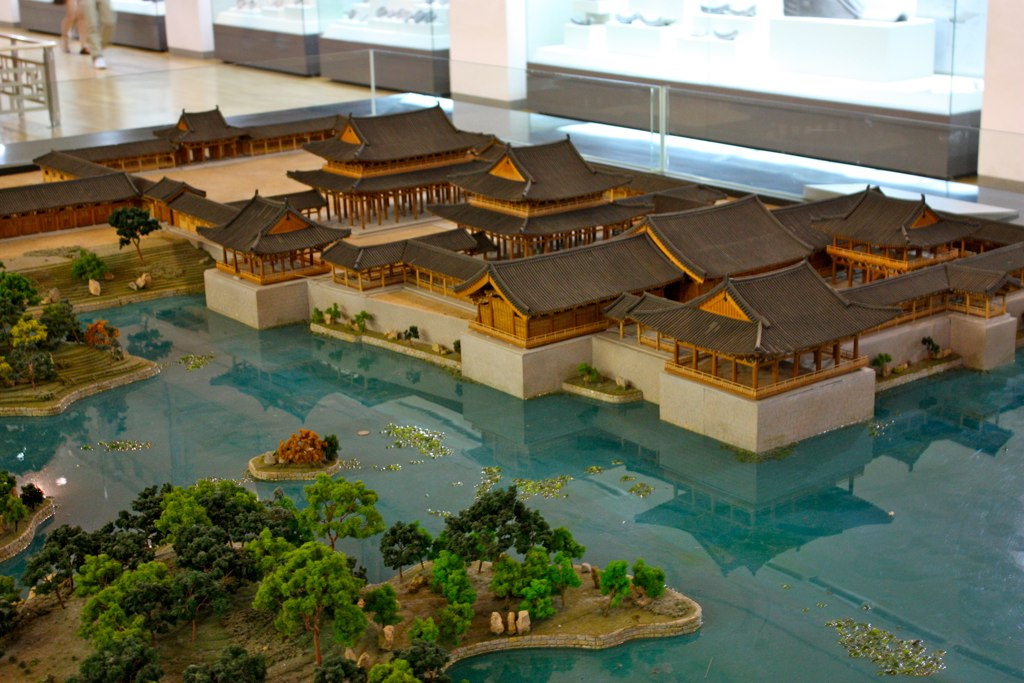
Model reconstruction of the Anapji Pond royal complex, a part of the Banwolseong.

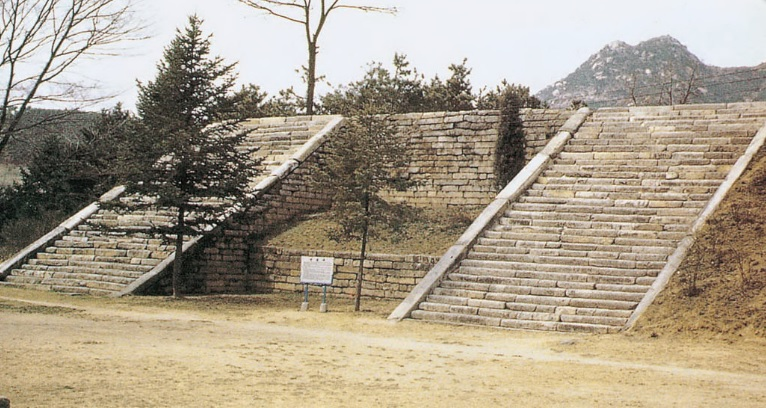
Destroyed remnants of the Manwoldae

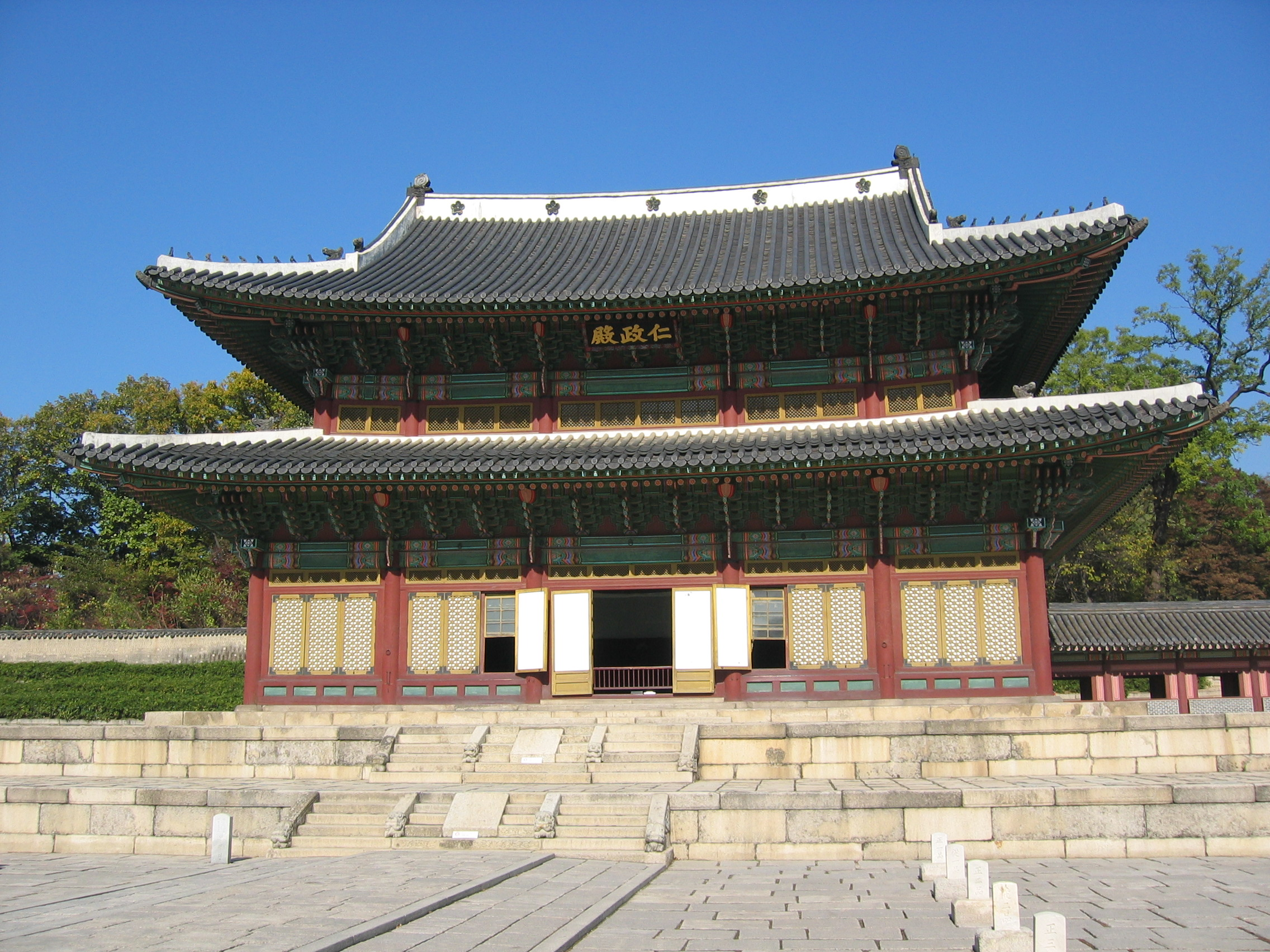
The Changdeokgung Palace of the Joseon Dynasty

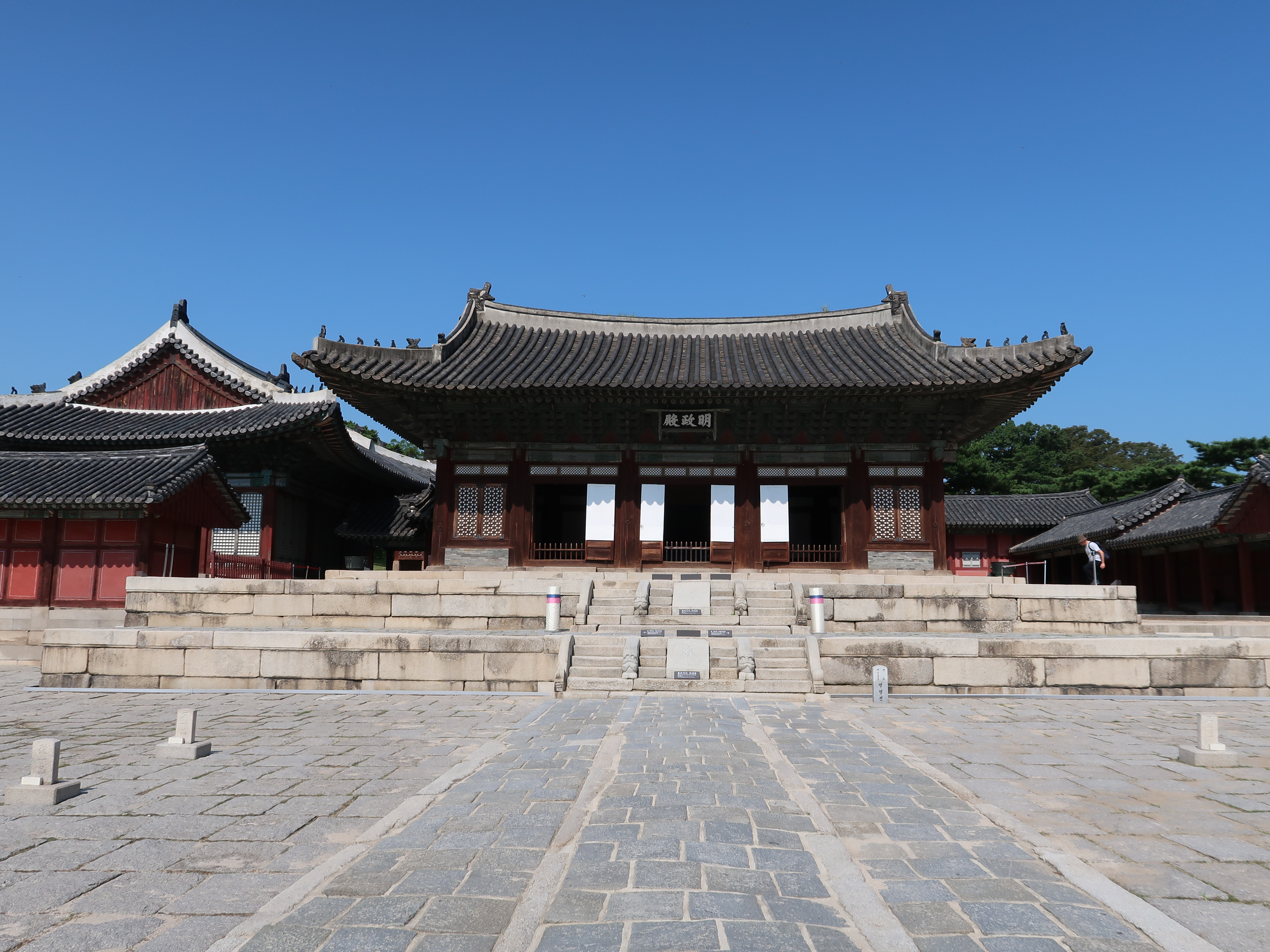
Changgyeonggung of the Joseon Dynasty

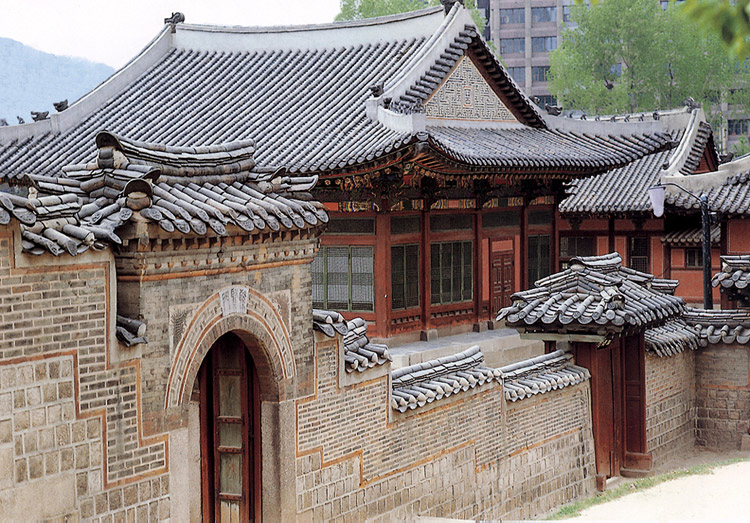
Royal architecture in the Deoksu Palace of Joseon

== See also ==
- Korean architecture
- History of Korea
- Asian architecture
- Korean fortress
- Korean pagoda
