= Mongol invasions of Korea =

1231–1271 Mongol Yuan conquests

- Part of Mongol invasions and conquests
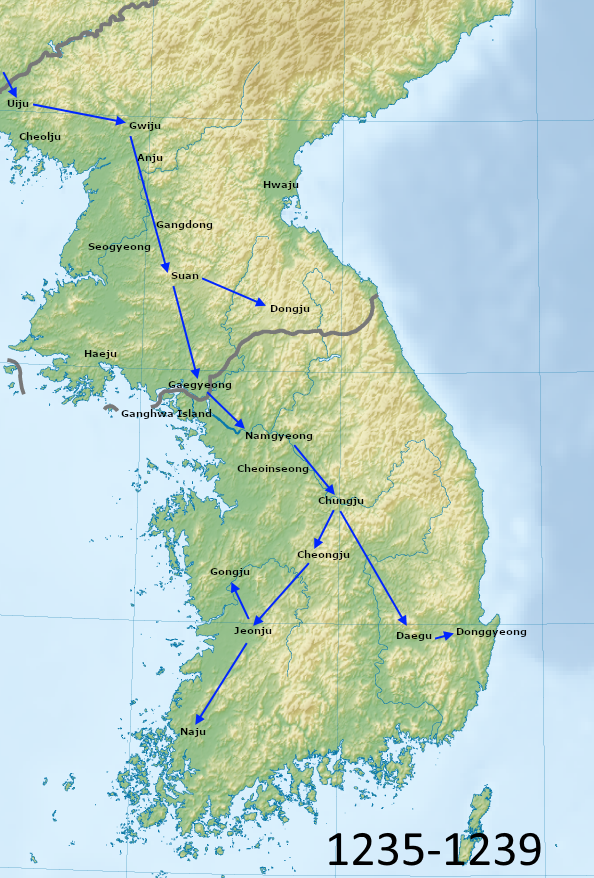
- 1235 Mongol invasion of Goryeo
Date	1231–1259 (intermittently)
Location	Korean Peninsula
Result	Mongol victory

Belligerents
Goryeo	Mongol Empire

Commanders and leaders
Ch'oe U Pak Seo; Kim Yun-hu; Lý Long Tường; Kim Gyeong-son; Choi Chunmyeong; Dae Jipseong; Lee Jaseong; Chae Song-nyeon; Kim Yun-hu; Lee Sehwa; Hyeon-Ryeo	Ögedei Khan; Möngke Khan; Subutai; Danqu; Putau; Yegü; Teke Qorči; Saritai †; Jalairtai

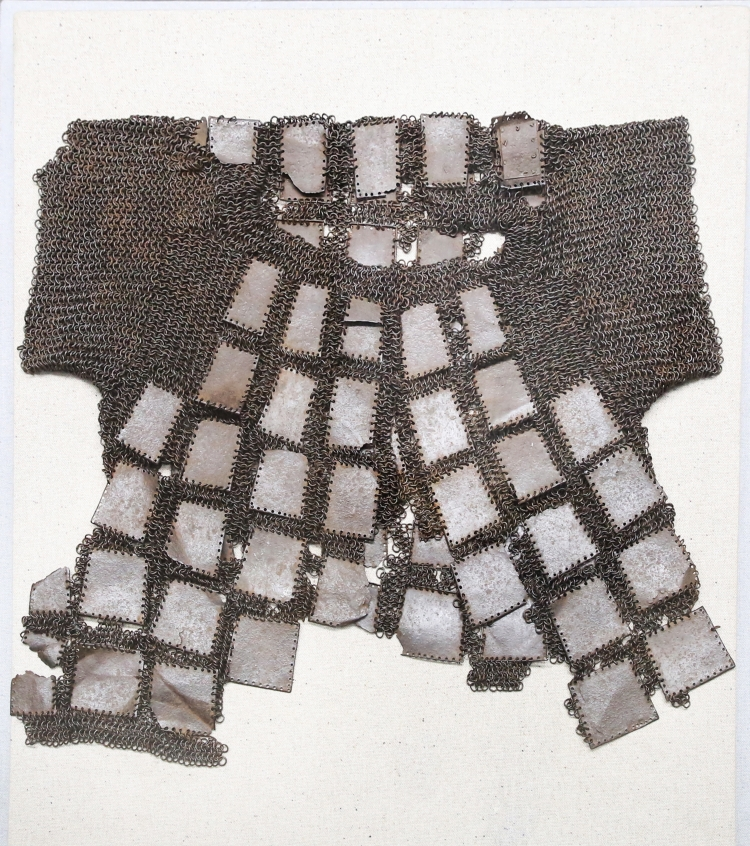
Mail shirt with attached metal plates, Goryeo, 14th c.

A series of campaigns were conducted between 1231 and 1270 by the Mongol Empire against the Korean kingdom of Goryeo. The last campaign concluded with a peace treaty with Goryeo becoming a vassal state of the Yuan dynasty, a relationship that lasted for approximately 80 years. Korea and the Song Dynasty of China put up a greater amount of "stubborn resistance" towards the Mongol invasions than many others in Eurasia who were swiftly crushed by the Mongols at a lightning pace.

The Yuan dynasty extracted wealth and tributes from the Goryeo kings. Despite their submission to the Yuan dynasty, internal conflicts among Goryeo's royalty and rebellions against Yuan rule continued, with the most notable being the Sambyeolcho Rebellion.

== Khitan invasion (1216–1219) ==
Goryeo first encountered the Mongols in 1211 when a Goryeo envoy to the Jin dynasty (1115–1234) was killed by Mongol soldiers.

Later the Mongols entered Goryeo while pursuing enemy Khitans. In 1211, the Khitan prince Yelü Liuge who had been serving the Jin as a military commander rebelled and seized a portion of Liaodong. Two years later he proclaimed himself the ruler of the Liao. Yelü Liuge was ousted by his younger brother, Yelü Sibu, and requested help from Genghis Khan against the usurper. Sibu was also usurped by one of his ministers, Yelü Qinu. In 1214, the Jin assigned Puxian Wannu to suppress the rebellion. However Puxian Wannu was defeated and he himself rebelled in 1215. Based in Dongjing ("Eastern Capital"), Puxian Wannu declared the state of Dazhen ("Great Jurchen"). In the spring of 1216, Khitans fleeing from the Jin overran Puxian Wannu's territory and held the area from Dengzhou to Poju (Uiju).

In 1216, the Mongols accompanied by Yelü Liuge chased the Khitan rebels to the Goryeo borders and launched an attack on Dafuying, located on an island in the lower course of the Yalu River. The Khitans requested help from Goryeo but when the request was denied, the Khitans crossed the Yalu with an estimated 90,000 men and overran the Goryeo frontier. The Khitan rebels spent 1217 pillaging southwards down the Korean Peninsula before several defeats at the hand of Korean General Kim Ch'wiryŏ forced them to retreat. They turned their attention back toward the territory of Puxian Wannu. Puxian Wannu had already been defeated by the Mongols and submitted, but when the Mongol forces withdrew, he moved further east toward the Yalu and in early 1217, declared the state of Dongxia ("Eastern Xia"). Pressured by the Jin, he fled eastward again to the lower reaches of the Tumen River. It was also there that the Khitans fled from Goryeo. The Khitans were able to gather reinforcements and then invaded Goryeo again in the fall of 1217. The Khitan invasion was halted after they took the city of Kangdong, where Goryeo forces managed to contain them.

In the winter of 1218, 10,000 Mongol troops commanded by Hazhen and Zhala accompanied by 20,000 Eastern Jurchen troops commanded by Wanyan Ziyuan entered Goryeo from the northeast. They defeated Khitan forces in the cities of Hwaju, Maengju, Sunju, and Tŏkchu. The Mongol-Jurchen advance was stopped by a heavy snowfall that made the roads impassable. Hazhen sent a letter carried by the translator Zhao Zhongxiang to Cho Ch'ung, the Goryeo commander in charge of the northwest, requesting provisions and demanding the two nations enter an Elder-Younger Brother relationship after the subjugation of the Khitans.

Cho Ch'ung and Kim Ch'wiryŏ were in favor of meeting the Mongol demands but the Goryeo court was more apprehensive. Ultimately they agreed to provide for the Mongol forces at the urging of Cho. One thousand bushels of rice and one thousand picked troops were sent to the Mongols. They arrived in time to witness the Mongols assault the Khitans in the walled-city of Taeju. The reinforcements were received well by the Mongols.

In early 1219, preparations were underway to take the last Khitan stronghold in Kangdong. Troops from Goryeo joined the Mongol-Jurchen force. An estimated 50,000 Khitans surrendered and opened the gates.

After the fall of Kangdong, Goryeo sent a delegation to Zhala's camp as well as gifts to the Mongol commanders. Mongol envoys met with Gojong of Goryeo (reigned 1213–1259) and handed him a document without the usual formalities. Cho accompanied the Mongol and Jurchen commanders to the Yalu where the Mongols seized a large number of Goryeo horses and left. However they left behind 41 subordinates in Poju to learn the language of Goryeo and to wait for the Mongols' return. The Mongols also started collecting annual tribute from Goryeo and within two years, Gojong was advocating for the cessation of tribute payments and resistance against the Mongols.

Conditions in the northwest were poor following the Khitan raids. In the autumn of 1219, military commanders Han Sun and Ta Chi rebelled in Poju and defected to Puxian Wannu, who augmented their forces with 10,000 Eastern Jurchens. They tried to make an alliance with the Jin commander Yugexia. Yugexia invited them to a feast and killed them. Their heads were sent to Kaesong in early 1220 for which Yugexia was rewarded greatly by the Goryeo court. However Yugexia repeatedly sacked Goryeo's border cities for several years afterward. Troops sent to Poju to restore order slew so many that another rebellion occurred four months later that required 5,000 troops to put down. Khitans who had fled into the mountains continued to raid Goryeo garrisons.

== First Mongol invasion of Korea (August 1231 – January 1232) ==
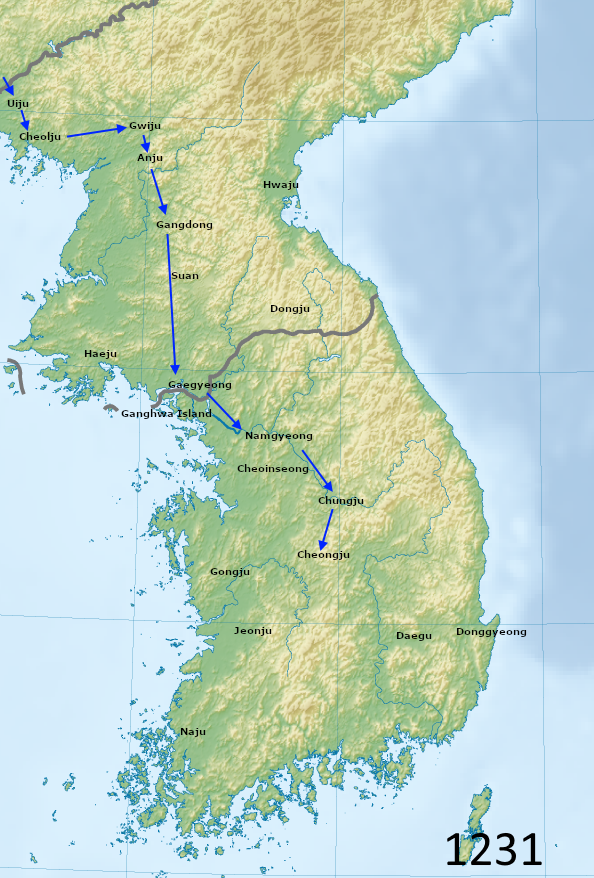
1231 Mongol invasion of Goryeo

In 1221, a Mongol delegation led by Zhuguyu made a list of demands while 6,000-7,000 Mongol troops arrived at the Goryeo border a few days later. They were received coldly by the Goryeo court. In 1224, Puxian Wannu declared independence from the Mongols and sent envoys to Goryeo to establish an alliance. Goryeo rejected the offer and over the next four years, Eastern Jurchens raided Goryeo. An attempt at peace negotiations was made in 1229 due to deteriorating relations between the Mongols and Goryeo.

A Mongol delegation led by Zhuguyu had arrived in 1224 to supervise the transfer of tribute. They took only the otter pelts but discarded the other items in the fields while crossing the Yalu. During their journey they were killed by bandits. Since the Mongols suspected Goryeo, relations had been terminated in early 1225. When the Mongols ordered Goryeo to attack Puxian Wannu, Goryeo did not comply.

On 26 August 1231, a Mongol force led by Saritai crossed the Yalu and surrounded Hamsin-chin (Uiju). Defense General Cho Sukch'ang and Deputy Commissioner Chŏn Kan surrendered Hamsin-chin to the Mongols. The Mongol forces split with one group heading north to attack Sakju while the other group headed down the Yalu. When the second group heading south reached Chongju, Kim Kyŏngson at first tried to fight the Mongols but the entire city had already fled, so he retreated to Kuju Castle. From Chongju, the Mongols proceeded to Inju where Hong Pok-wŏn defected and submitted the area and 1,500 households. His family later played a pivotal role in the Mongol campaigns against Goryeo by acting as guides. At Ch'ŏlchu (in Hamgyong Province), the men slit their throats and burned the granary and all the women and children rather than submit to the Mongols.Yongju, Sonju, and Kwakchu fell in October.

The Mongols bypassed Chaju and the Western Capital (Pyongyang) where they encountered stiff resistance. The slave army led by Ji Gwang-su fought to the death. They took Hwangju before reaching Chabi Pass, the gateway to Kaesong.

Ch'oe U called up the Three Armies and levied troops from the provinces. Yugexia contributed 5,000 soldiers and even bandits entered the Goryeo army. The Three Armies under the leadership of Yi Chasŏng departed Kaesong in early October and fended off a surprise attack by 8,000 Mongol soldiers. The Goryeo army was defeated at Anju, after which Goryeo started negotiations with the Mongols. However, when news that the Mongols demanded Goryeo's submission reached the court in late November, the Goryeo response was to continue resistance. Kaesong was surrounded by Mongol forces in late December. Goryeo officially submitted and the Three Armies surrendered.

Goryeo's surrender did not mean an immediate end to the fighting. The Mongols sacked cities which they had previously taken. Chŏn Kan attempted to kill the Mongols in Hamsin-chin but a certain Xiaoweisheng escaped. Chaju held out while heavy fighting occurred at Chongju. At the Siege of Kuju, Pak Sŏ led forces who had gathered from surrounding cities in a defense against the Mongols. Kim Chungon defended the eastern and western walls while Kim Kyŏngson defended the south. The Mongols attacked the west, south, and north gates repeatedly. They used carts of grass and wood as well as towers to try to scale the walls but the defenders countered with molten iron, setting fire to the siege machines. They also tried to mine the city walls but the tunnel collapsed. The south wall was attacked by 15 large catapults. The defenders used their own catapults to drive off the attackers while using mud and water to put out fires by inflammatory projectiles. The Mongols withdrew for a time after 40 days of besieging the city only to return with reinforcements. They set up 30 catapults and breached the city wall in 50 places but they were repaired while Pak Sŏ made a successful sortie and drove off the attackers. Kuju and Chaju finally submitted after multiple orders from the Goryeo court. Pak Sŏ and Ch'oe Ch'unmyŏmg, defender of Chaju, were almost executed but the Mongols spared them owing to their courage, which they admired.

Saritai demanded 10,000 small horses, 10,000 large horses, 10,000 bolts of purple gauze, 20,000 otter skins, and clothing for a million men army. Hostages from the king's family, provincial leaders, and high officials were also demanded. A large tribute was presented by Goryeo but no hostages. General Saritai began withdrawing his main force to the north in the spring of 1232, leaving 72 Mongol administrative officials (Darughachi) stationed in various cities in northwestern Goryeo to ensure that Goryeo kept to the peace terms. They controlled almost all of modern North Pyongan Province and a great portion of South Pyongan Province as well.

== Second Mongol invasion of Korea (June 1232 – December 1232) ==
The capital of Goryeo was moved to Ganghwado for the duration of the Mongol Invasions. The new capital was strongly fortified and was never conquered by the Mongols.

When the Mongols threatened Kaesong in the previous invasion, Ch'oe U sent his family to Ganghwa Island. In the spring of 1232, Ch'oe U gathered all the high officials at his residence and suggested transferring the capital to Ganghwa. A dissenter, Kim Sech'ung, was executed for speaking out against the plan. The royal family relocated to Ganghwa and commissioners were sent out to the provinces to instruct the people to take refuge in mountain citadels or coastal islands. With the transfer complete, in the summer of 1232, the Mongol darughachis on the mainland were killed.

The Western Capital (Pyongyang) was still under the control of Hong Pok-wŏn, a Goryeo warlord who had defected to the Mongols. When the people of the Western Capital learned that the court was planning on killing the Mongol officials, they rebelled out of fear that Mongol reprisal would result in their deaths. Government officials in the Western Capital fled to Chŏ Island.

In the summer of 1232, the Mongol invasion led by Saritai advanced south into the Han valley without much resistance. However in an attack on Ch'ŏin-song, Saritai was killed by an arrow shot by the monk Kim Yun-hu. The Mongol army retreated, leaving Hong Pok-wŏn to supervise the territory that they had conquered.

In the spring of 1233, a Mongol envoy delivered a list detailing Goryeo's crimes. The Goryeo response was an offensive against Hong Pok-wŏn to oust him from the Western Capital. Hong escaped with his family to Mongol territory in Liaoyang and Shenyang while the Western Capital's people were resettled in island locations. The Mongols appointed Hong as leader of northwestern Goryeo.

== Third Mongol invasion of Korea and treaty (July 1235 – April 1239) ==
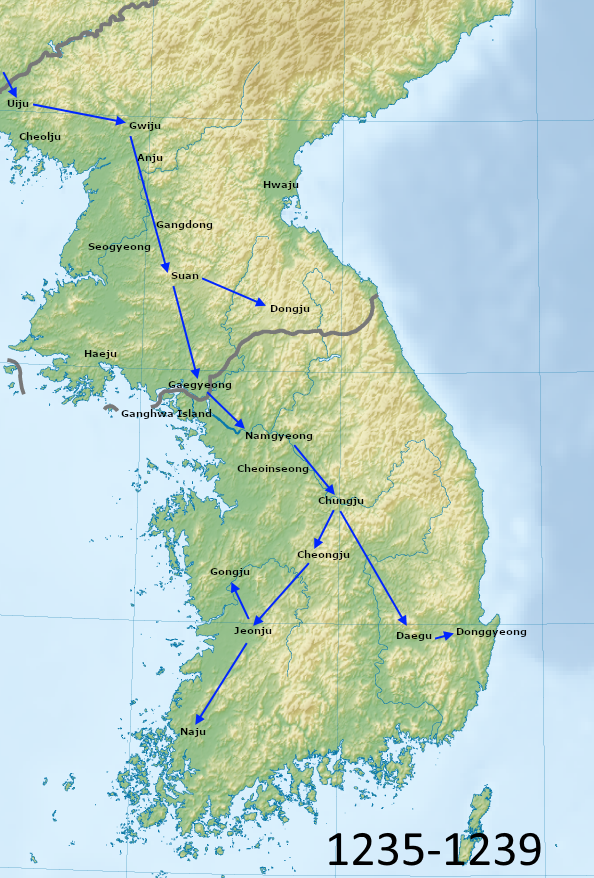
1235 Mongol invasion of Goryeo

By late 1233, Güyük and Prince Alchidai had defeated Puxian Wannu and in early 1234, conquered the Jin dynasty. In the kurultai of 1235, Ögedei Khan gave orders to attack Goryeo, Southern Song, the people west of the Volga, and to push to the edge of Kashmir.

In the summer of 1235, Mongol troops raided Goryeo. Defenses were put up around Ganghwa Island and the people of the Southern Capital (modern Seoul) and Gwangju were ordered to evacuate to the island. By late 1235, Mongol and Eastern Jurchen troops under the command of Tanqut-Batur had taken Yonggang, Hamjong, Samdŭng, and Haep'yong (modern Sangju). In the spring of 1236, Mongol troops moved south and took Hwangju, Sinju, and Anju. By wintertime, the Mongols had reached as far south as the Southern Capital and penetrated Cheongju.

Goryeo did not attempt to field an army against the Mongols and instead decentralized its army and initiated guerilla warfare through the use of Sambyeolcho units. This was a deliberate policy due to the experiences of fielding large armies against the Mongols during the first years of the conflict. Historian Remco Breuker notes that despite Koryo's long standing tradition of military excellence, Koryö repeatedly lost large battles against Mongol forces. In 1231, while going north, the Three Armies, the backbone of the Koryö military, narrowly escaped defeat when they were surprise attacked by a Mongol army. The presence of the skilled irregular fighters of Jin general Yugexia saved the day. The Korean leadership concluded that engaging the Mongols with a large army was potentially disastrous. Centuries of small-scale frontier warfare in the north had taught Koryö frontier commanders (as well as the local population) that small, mobile units of elite fighters were much harder to detect and to defeat, especially when faced with the equally mobile Mongols. According to all extant records, of all the battles and confrontations, only offensives executed by Goryeo mobile units and defensive actions by defenders entrenched in (mountain) fortresses were successful against the Mongols.

In conjunction with his previous order evacuating the capital from Kaesong to Ganghwa Island, the military dictator of Goryeo Choe U ordered the populations of regions under (threat of) attack to evacuate in mountain strongholds or to coastal islands. This increased the chances of survival for the populace, especially when all agricultural activity had to cease. This policy, aimed at maintaining a certain population level in order to collect taxes, was followed until the end of military rule in Koryö. Ganghwa Island itself was heavily defended and the Mongols never attempted to take it. During the invasion, King Gojong ordered a set of printing blocks for the Buddhist canon to be created and work began in 1237. The Goryeo Daejanggyeong was completed in 1248.

Some people in Goryeo defected to the Mongols. In the summer of 1238, 2,000 men under the leadership of Cho Hyŏnsŭp and Yi Wŏnu submitted to the Mongols. Cho was put under the command of Hong Pok-wŏn. A Yi Kunsik also defected with 12 people.

Negotiations were opened in the winter of 1238 with Goryeo promising eternal submission, after which the Mongols withdrew. The Mongol envoys brought a list of demands that included that the king of Goryeo present himself at the Mongol court. Goryeo's Queen Dowager had just died and the king used the mourning period as an excuse to avoid compliance. Many more excuses were given later including illness and that he was too advanced in his age. Goryeo sent as a hostage Chŏn, the Duke of Sinan, and passed him off as the king's brother. He went to the Mongol court with a retinue of 148 men to present a petition and tribute. A royal relative, Wang Sun, the Duke of Yŏngnyŏng, was also sent as a hostage to the Mongol court while pretending to be the crown prince. The arrival of the 17-year old pretend prince at the Mongol court in 1241 and the resumption of tribute missions secured a moment of respite for Goryeo until 1247.

Goryeo's capital was not relocated back to the mainland despite Mongol demands. Gojong did meet Mongol envoys on the mainland a few years later, but Ch'oe U and his successors, the ones responsible for defending Goryeo, remained on the island for the rest of their lives. The momentary peace was used to send messages to southern Goryeo with instructions to prepare the defenses. Goryeo's continued resistance resulted in another Mongol invasion in 1247.

== Fourth Mongol invasion of Korea (July 1247 – March 1248) ==
In the fall of 1247, a Mongol force commanded by Amukan and a supporting force led by Hong Pok-wŏn arrived in Yŏmju (modern Yonan County). After Güyük Khan died in 1248, the royal hostage Wang Chŏn returned to Goryeo. The Mongols controlled the area north of the Chongchon River and raided Goryeo. The Eastern Jurchens also raided Goryeo from late 1249 to late 1250. Ch'oe U died in 1249 and was succeeded by his son, Ch'oe Hang, who continued defending Ganghwa Island and fortifying it. People in the northwest were evacuated to Kaesong and Sŏhae Province in April 1250.

== Fifth Mongol invasion of Korea (July 1253 – January 1254) ==
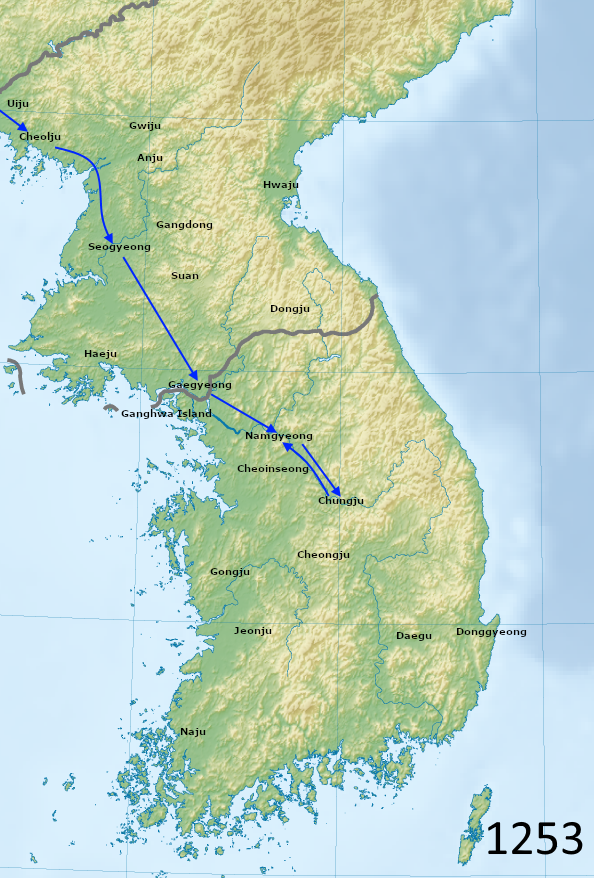
1253 Mongol invasion of Goryeo

When Möngke Khan ascended the throne in 1251, he repeated demands for the king of Goryeo to visit the Mongol court and for the Goryeo authorities to leave Ganghwa island and return to the old capital on the mainland. The Goryeo court refused these demands with the excuse that the king was unable to travel so far owing to his age. By the autumn of 1252, Goryeo sent orders to prepare for another invasion.

In early 1253, 300 Eastern Jurchen cavalry surrounded Tŭngju in the northwest and a small raiding party was reported in the summer. Some inhabitants of Wonju who had been taken captive by the Mongols returned to Goryeo to inform the authorities that Möngke had ordered an invasion led by the prince Yekü, Sung-chu, Amukan, and Hong Pok-wŏn.

On 3 August 1253, the Mongol forces crossed the Yalu River. By 10 August, they had crossed the Taedong River. They met no concerted opposition in the field other than defensive holdouts and raiding ambushes on their patrols. Chungju managed to hold out through a 70 day siege by the Mongols. However they were unable to break out of the city and obtain supplies. The inhabitants started starving to death and some burnt themselves and their families. In the end, the Mongols massacred the city's inhabitants.

In the winter of 1253, Yekü fell ill at Chungju and returned north to recover, leaving Amukan and Hong Pok-wŏn in command of field operations. A Mongol delegation led by Mangudai met Gojong of Goryeo on the mainland at his new palace in Sŭnch'ŏn-pu. Gojong agreed to move back to the mainland and sent his stepson, Ch'ang the Duke of An'gyŏng, as hostage to the Mongols. However Ch'oe Hang did not leave Ganghwa Island. The Mongol forces withdrew when Yekü was dismissed from service due to his resentment for being attached to the forces of Prince Talaer.

== Sixth Mongol invasion of Korea (August 1254 – March 1255) ==
On 19 August 1254, a Mongol army entered the northwest. On 6 September 1254, Jalairtai crossed the Yalu with a force of 5,000 men. On 8 September, 3,000 Mongol cavalry reached Sŏhae Province. Ch'ang the Duke of An'gyŏng was sent back to repeat Mongol demands for Goryeo's submission. Goryeo sent a delegate to Jalairtai with gifts hoping to buy them off but the delegate returned to Goryeo with additional demands by the Mongols for the ministers and people to shave their heads and submit, which Goryeo refused.

Jalairtai's forces attacked Chungju but a violent storm forced them to lift the siege. The Mongol forces headed further south while Eastern Jurchen troops also entered Goryeo. In the winter, the Mongols attacked a mountain citadel at Sangju. The Mongols lost half their forces and a 4th ranking official was shot by a Buddhist monk from Hwangnyongsa before they lifted the siege. In the spring of 1255, Möngke Khan ordered Jalairtai to withdraw and the Mongol forces retreated to Uiju and Chongju. The invasion had caused massive destruction to Goryeo. An estimated 206,800 captives had been taken by the Mongols and starvation was so rampant that it was reported that babies were tied up in trees and abandoned.

Möngke realized that the hostage was not the blood prince of the Goryeo Dynasty. So Möngke blamed the Goryeo court for deceiving him and killing the family of Lee Hyeong, who was a pro-Mongol Korean general.

== Seventh Mongol invasion of Korea (August 1255 – October 1256) ==
In August 1255, the Mongols began raiding south of the Chongchon River. Jalairtai's army arrived at Gaegyeong in the next month. The Mongols built ships and attacked Cho Island but were defeated. In early 1256, they attacked the southern islands. Goryeo sent General Yi Kwang and General Song Kunbi to fend off the attack. Song defeated the Mongols in a ruse and captured four of their officials.

In mid-1256, the Goryeo patrols (pyŏlch'o) attacked small Mongol regiments. The Mongols tried to take Chungju but sallies by the defenders and Ch'oe Hang's Guard Corps dealt heavy casualties to the Mongol forces. Jalairtai encamped at Haeyang in South Jeolla Province until Möngke ordered him to withdraw in the fall of 1256.

== Eighth Mongol invasion of Korea (May 1257 – October 1257) ==
Conditions in Goryeo were dire after years of invasions. Conditions on both Ganghwa Island and the countryside were deteriorating rapidly. Thieves were reported stealing from the Household Bureau of the crown prince and despite the lack of snow in the winter, the roads were strewn with corpses from starvation and disease. People were paying for rice with silver. An uprising in Wonju occurred in mid-1257 due to the lack of rice. Famine struck the capital in the summer.

The Mongols and Eastern Jurchens invaded in the summer of 1257. They reached Gaegyeong and demanded the Goryeo king to meet them and provide the crown prince as a royal hostage. Goryeo tried to buy them off twice to no avail. Meanwhile the Mongols captured two islands on the western coastline.

In October 1257, a Goryeo delegation led by Kim Sugang convinced the Mongol Court to withdraw their forces. During the time he was away from Goryeo, Ch'oe Hang had died and was succeeded by his son, Ch'oe Ŭi.

== Ninth Mongol invasion of Korea (1258–1259) ==
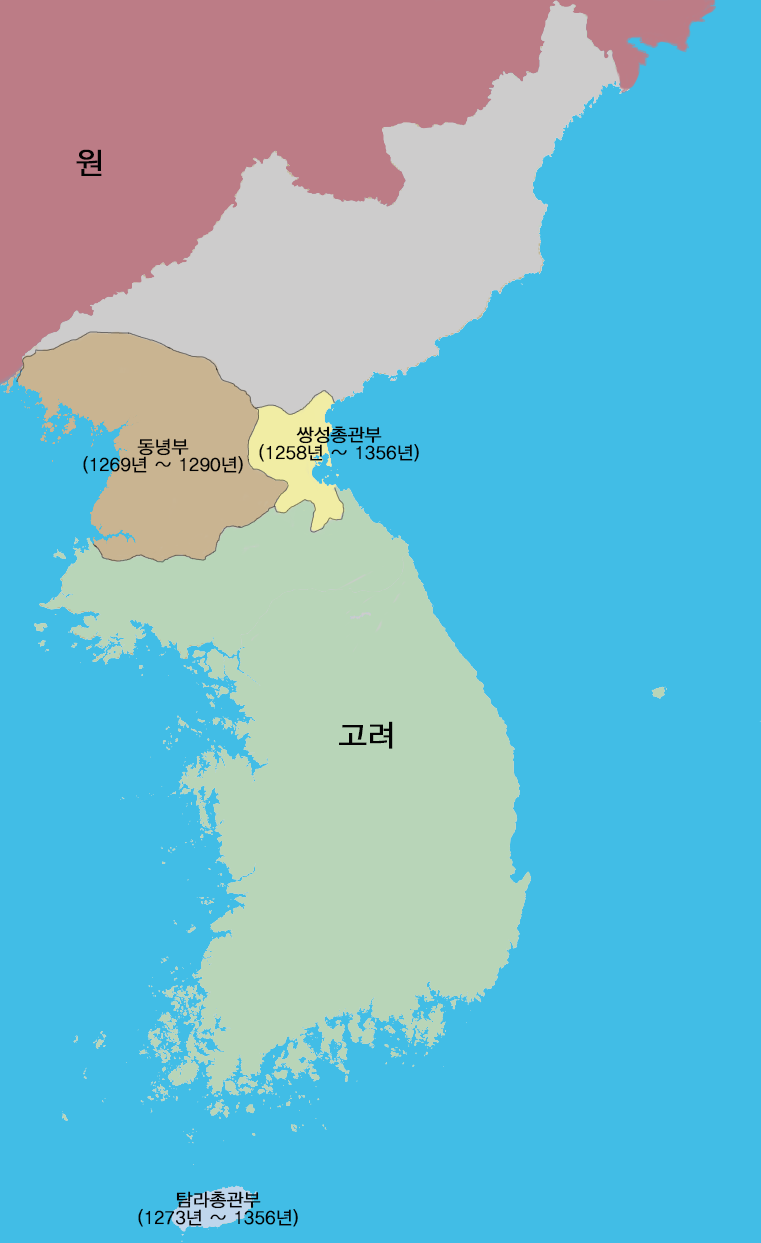
Ssangsŏng Prefecture, highlighted in yellow.

After the death of Ch'oe Hang, Ch'oe Ŭi alienated both the commoners as well as his supporters. He refused to open the granaries and provide famine relief while dispensing tiny amounts of rice. He sidelined the old Cho'e clan retainer Kim Injun and expelled Grand General Song Kiryu, who had been a supporter of Ch'oe Hang. Ch'oe Ŭi's detractors conspired to kill him but the plot was leaked to Ŭi. However it was too late and at dawn, the conspirators' forces knocked down the walls around Ŭi's home and killed him. Power was restored to the Goryeo king.

The parties involved in the coup were the Confucian-Royalist faction led by Yu Kyŏng and Ch'oe Cha and the military faction of Kim Injun. The Confucian-Royalists wished to submit to the Mongols while the military did not, but both agreed that only concessions to the Mongols would stop the fighting, so they supported sending the crown prince as a hostage. In July 1258, the Mongols threatened that they would attack Ganghwa Island if the king and crown prince did not meet them at Gaegyeong, which the king refused on grounds that he was too old to make the journey.

Goryeo's delegation told the Mongols that the crown prince would meet them but when Yesüder, a co-commander of the Mongol forces in Goryeo, arrived at the designated meeting spot at Mt. Paengma, he was told that the crown prince was ill and would be unable to meet him. For the next ten months, the Mongols ravaged the countryside. The Mongols had decided to completely occupy Goryeo, starting by building walls around Uiju earlier in 1258. In the winter of 1258, the Eastern Jurchens arrived with a fleet.

In the northeast, the people rebelled against Goryeo's administration and defected to the Mongols. Led by Cho Hwi and T'ak Ch'ŏng, they killed the Goryeo administrators and submitted to the Mongols, who established Ssangsŏng Prefecture in their area. Cho Hwi became General Superintendent, a position that was inherited by his son and grandson, while T'ak Ch'ŏng became a chiliarch. Cho's men aided the Mongols in attacking other Goryeo cities. The Goryeo court tried to prevent its people from defecting with small provisions of silver and silk to the walled cities, but such measures were too meager to be of any use.

In the spring of 1259, a peace agreement was concluded. The Goryeo court agreed to send the crown prince and future king (Wonjong) the Mongol Court as a hostage and to move the capital from Ganghwa Island back to Gaegyeong. However the move back to Gaegyeong would not happen until many years later.

== Aftermath ==
Much of Goryeo was devastated after the decades of fighting. It was said that no wooden structures remained afterward in Goryeo. There was cultural destruction, and the nine-floor-tower of Hwangnyongsa and the first Tripitaka Koreana were destroyed. After seeing the Goryeo crown prince come to concede, Kublai Khan was jubilant and said "Goryeo is a country that long ago even Tang Taizong personally campaigned against but was unable to defeat, but now the crown prince comes to me, it is the will of heaven!" (Note: Kublai was referring to Goguryeo, which Goryeo claimed descendence from)

Historian Remco Breuker attributes the relative success of the Koryõ resistance against the Mongols as a direct consequence of the decentralized structure and guerilla tactics of the Sambyeolcho as well as the forced retreat of the population to mountain fortresses and coastal islands to safeguard the people for tax purposes. Breuker writes that this new strategy turned out to be highly successful (if also very costly in all respects). Despite six massively destructive invasions, the Mongol armies never conquered Koryö. The absorption of Koryö into the Yuan Empire became possible only after internal conditions in Koryö made further war with the Yuan politically undesirable for king and court and emphatically not after Koryö had been forced to its knees manu militari. After forty years of intermittent warfare, a peace treaty was concluded that returned the Koryö royal house to the nexus of power, while providing the final blow for military rule in Koryö. This was done in spite of the fierce resistance mounted by the Sambyeolcho and the establishment of a short-lived rival state and dynasty to Koryö and its ruling house.

Internal struggles within the royal court continued regarding the peace with the Mongols until 1270. Since Ch'oe Ch'ung-hŏn, Goryeo had been a military dictatorship, ruled by the private army of the powerful Ch'oe family. Some of these military officials formed the Sambyeolcho Rebellion (1270–1273) and resisted in the islands off the southern shore of the Korean peninsula.

Beginning with Wonjong, for approximately 80 years, Goryeo was a vassal state and compulsory ally of the Yuan dynasty. The Mongol and Korean rulers were also tied by marriages as some Mongol prince and aristocrats married Korean princesses and vice versa. During the reign of Kublai Khan, King Chungnyeol of Goryeo married one of Kublai's daughters. Later, a Korean princess called the Empress Gi became an empress through her marriage with Toghon Temür, and her son, Ayushiridara became an emperor of the Northern Yuan dynasty. The Kings of Goryeo held an important status like other important families of Mardin, Uyghurs and Mongols (Oirat, Hongirat, and Ikeres). It is claimed that one of Goryeo monarchs was the most beloved grandson of Kublai Khan and had grown up at the Yuan court.

The Mongol darughachis at the court of the Goryeo were offered provisions and sometimes were also willing to actively be involved in the affairs of the Goryeo court. Even today, there are several Mongolian words used in the Jeju Island. Furthermore, the Mongol domination of Eurasia encouraged cultural exchange, and this would include for example the transmission of some of the Korean ideas and technology to other areas under Mongol control.

The Goryeo dynasty survived under influence of the Yuan dynasty until it began to force Yuan garrisons back starting in the 1350s, when the Yuan dynasty was already beginning to crumble, suffering from massive rebellions in China. Taking advantage of the opportunity, the Goryeo army under Goryeo king Gongmin also managed to regain some northern territories. Empress Gi sent the Mongol army to invade Goryeo in 1364, but it failed.

== See also ==
- History of Korea
- Korea under Mongol rule
- Sambyeolcho Rebellion
- Mongol conquest of Eastern Xia
- Han conquest of Gojoseon
