= Kublai Khan's campaigns =

Mongol military efforts

Kublai Khan's Campaigns
- Part of Mongol invasions and conquests
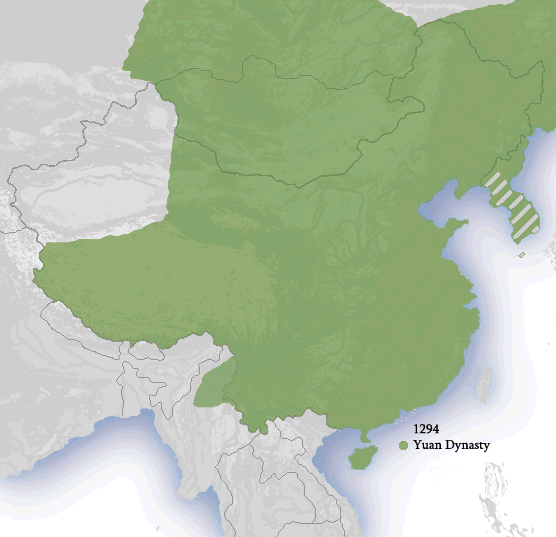
- The Yuan dynasty under Kublai Khan after the conquest of the Southern Song dynasty.
Date	1266–1293
Location	South China, Japan, Vietnam, Korea, Burma, Java
Result	Kublai Khan's conquest of China proper, Parts of Burma, and Korea; Rise of the Yuan dynasty and Shan States; Fall of the Southern Song dynasty and Bagan Kingdom; Defeat of Sambyeolcho Rebels; Victory for the Kamakura shogunate, Majapahit, Đại Việt; Yuan tributary status for Đại Việt and Champa
Territorial changes	Southern China, Korea and Upper Burma added into the Yuan dynasty

Belligerents
Yuan dynasty	Kamakura shogunate Song dynasty Đại Việt (Trần dynasty); Champa; Sambyeolcho rebels Bagan Kingdom; Majapahit; Goryeo

Commanders and leaders
Kublai Khan (Emperor Shizu of Yuan)	Hōjō Tokimune; Emperor Lizong of Song; Emperor Duzong of Song; Emperor Gong of Song; Emperor Duanzong of Song; Zhao Bing †; Trần Nhân Tông; Pae Chung-son †; Kim T'ong-jŏng †; Narathihapate; Yanda Pyissi †; Raden Wijaya; King Wonjong of Goryeo

Strength
Total: 581,000+: 450,000 Mongols; 100,000 Chinese; 40,000 Koreans	Total: 1,610,000+: 1,500,000+ Chinese; 120,000+ Japanese

Casualties and losses
Total: 250,000+ dead	Total: Over 10,000,000 including Chinese civilians killed

Kublai Khan, founder of the Yuan dynasty, led several campaigns during the Mongol invasions and conquests. These included the Mongol invasions of Japan, First Mongol invasion of Burma, Mongol invasion of Java, second and third Mongol invasions of Vietnam, Mongol invasion of Champa and putting down the Sambyeolcho Rebellion.

== Campaigns against Song dynasty ==
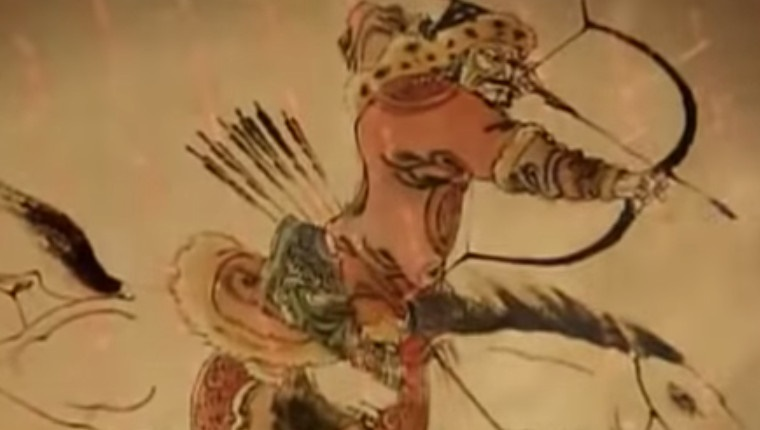
Mongol warrior on horseback, preparing a mounted archery shot.

The campaign for Kublai Khan to conquer southern China under the Southern Song dynasty were specified under the years between 1266 and 1276. This included the declaration of Kublai Khan as the new emperor of China in the year 1271 This was the start of the Yuan dynasty that was a rule incorporated with elements of both Han and Mongol influences. After successfully eliminating all resistance to the new Yuan dynasty, Kublai Khan wanted to expand his empire by attacking Japan and built around 300-600 vessels in preparation for the assault on Japan.

== Campaigns against Japan ==
Kublai Khan's armada in 1274 made a tactical mistake by sailing into open seas that became targets for the Japanese cannons. Suffering heavy losses, the remaining fleet retreated and prepared for the next invasion. Again on 1281, the Japanese samurais were more than prepared to hold off an invasion attempt by Kublai Khan's fleet, and which they did so with great success. Even though the campaign failed in the end due to stiff Japanese resistance, Kublai Khan's campaigns saw the development of gunpowder as a form of weaponry.

== Campaigns against Burma, Java and Vietnam ==
Besides the Song dynasty and Japan, Kublai Khan also launched campaigns against Burma, Java and Vietnam. A series of military conflicts between the Yuan dynasty and the Pagan Empire took place between 1277 and 1287, collectively known as the First Mongol invasion of Burma. The invasion toppled the 250-year-old Pagan Empire and the Yuan dynasty annexed Upper Burma. However, Yuan invasions of both Java and Vietnam resulted in failure. Nevertheless, both the Trần dynasty (Đại Việt) and Champa decided to accept the nominal supremacy of the Yuan dynasty in order to avoid further conflicts.
