= Kim T'ongjŏng =

Goryeo general (fl. 13th century)

- Hangul: 김통정
- Hanja: 金通精
- RR: Gim Tongjeong
- MR: Kim T'ongjŏng

Kim T'ongjŏng (Korean: 김통정; Hanja: 金通精, died 1273) was a general in Goryeo dynasty who fought in the Sambyeolcho Rebellion against the central government.

== Sambyeolcho Rebellion ==
After Pae Chung-son was killed on the island Jindo by Goryeo-Mongolian allied forces at 1271, Kim T'ongjŏng and a few Sambyeolcho Army escaped Jindo and moved to Tamna (now Jeju Island). After, he still was opposed to Mongol Yuan dynasty. In 1273, Korean Goryeo government sailed to Tamna and defeated the rebellion with the aid of Mongol forces. Kim T'ongjŏng and 70 of his men escaped to Hallasan. The 70 were later captured but not Kim himself who was presumed dead. It was assumed that he committed suicide, although some tales of him in Jeju tell of he being killed by Kim Panggyŏng of Goryeo who later killed Kim's pregnant wife.

There are two views about Kim T'ongjŏng. In the Goryeo dynasty, he is perceived as a bad general as he is described at Goryeosa (History of Goryeo) due to stealing and bothering Tamna. On the contrast, the subjects of Tamna recorded that he was treated like hero.

== See also ==
- Sambyeolcho Rebellion
- Pae Chung-son
- Sambyeolcho
- Goryeo
- Mongol invasions of Korea
