= Sambyeolcho Rebellion =

1270–1273 conflict in Korea

- Part of Mongol invasions of Korea and Kublai Khan's campaigns
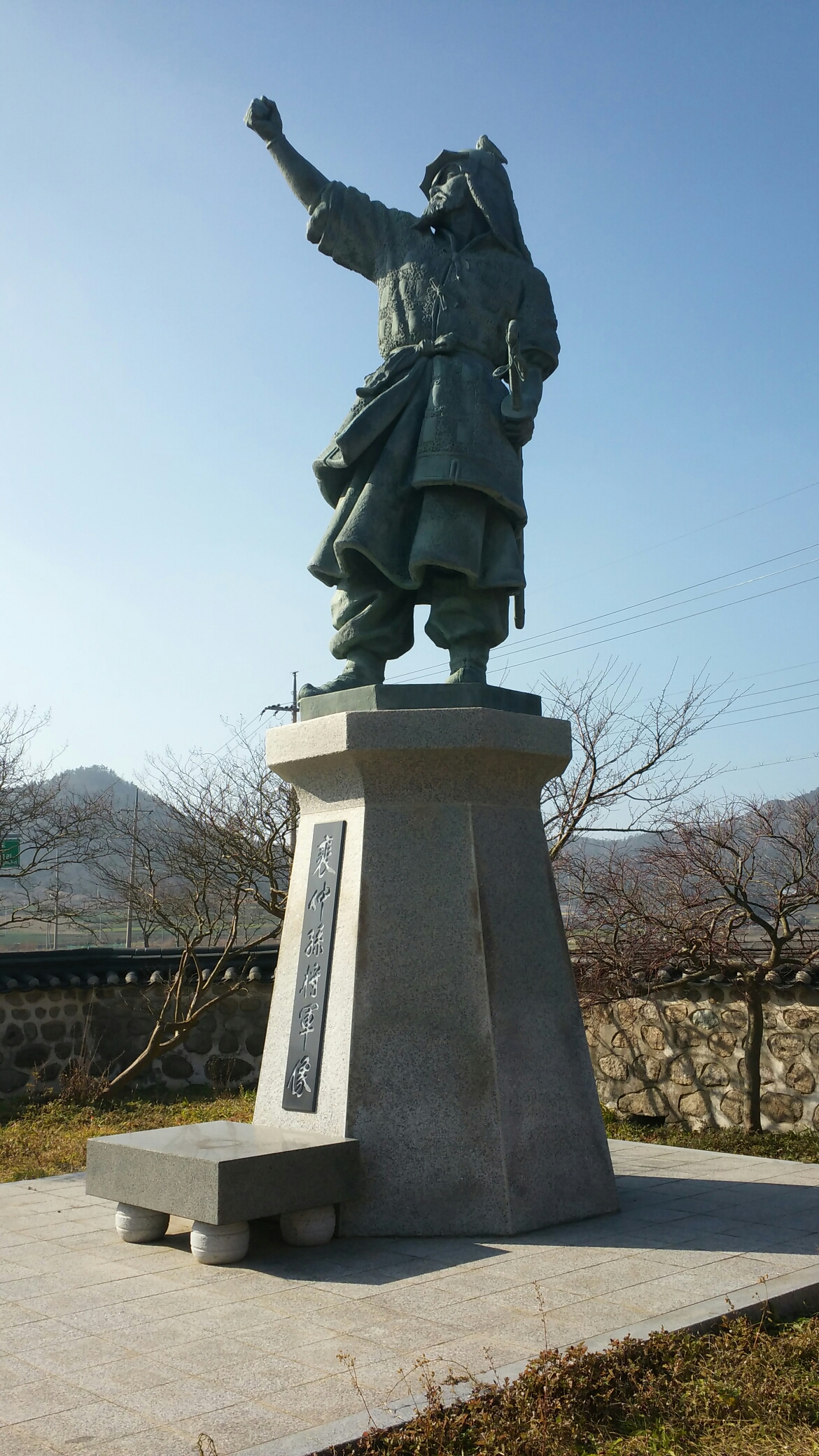
- Pae Chung-son, the leader of Sambyeolcho Rebellion
| Date | 1270–1273 |
| Location | Korean Peninsula, Ganghwado, Jindo, Jejudo |
| Result | Yuan–Goryeo victory |

Belligerents
| Sambyeolcho army | Yuan dynasty: Goryeo |

Commanders and leaders
| Pae Chung-son †; Kim T'ong-jŏng † | Goryeo; King Wonjong; Kim Pang-gyŏng; Yuan dynasty Kublai Khan; Heundo (炘都) |

Strength
| 700 | 12,000 |

- Sambyeolcho Rebellion
- Hangul: 삼별초의 난
- Hanja: 三別抄의 亂
- RR: Sambyeolchoui nan
- MR: Sambyŏlch'oŭi nan

The Sambyeolcho Rebellion (1270–1273) was a Korean rebellion against the pro-Mongol Goryeo dynasty that happened near the end of the Mongol invasions of Korea. It was suppressed by Goryeo and the Mongol Yuan dynasty. After the rebellion, Goryeo became a vassal state of the Yuan dynasty.

== Background ==
From 1231, Goryeo was intermittently invaded by the Mongol Empire. During this time, Goryeo was controlled by a military regime led by the Ch'oe family. In 1232, the government under the nominal king fled to Ganghwa Island, which Mongol horse riders were unable to land on, and resisted the Mongol invasion. Because of its fragile foundation, Goryeo faced frequent rebellions. The 1258 rebellion resulted in the establishment of Ssangseong and Dongnyeong Prefectures by the Mongols.

Unlike these rebels, the Sambyeolcho (Three Extraordinary Watches) were an organ of the military government. They were organized by the Ch'oe family to maintain security. However, unlike the Ch'oe private guards unit (which personally protected the family), the Sambyeolcho assumed public functions performed by police and combat forces, effectively replacing the Six Divisions of the military.

In 1258, Ch'oe Ŭi, the fourth dictator of the Ch'oe family, was overthrown by Kim Chun (also known as Kim In-jun) using the Sambyeolcho. Kim Chun took a pro-Mongol policy and sent Crown Prince Wang Chŏng to the Mongol Empire. At the same time, King Gojong and the crown prince approached the Mongols to restore power from Kim Chun.

In 1268, however, Kim Chun was annihilated by the Sambyeolcho under the order of Im Yŏn. The next year, Im Yŏn's attempt to replace King Wonjong was reversed by the crown prince (Chungnyeol) with the help from the Mongol force. In 1270, Im Yŏn's successor Im Yu-mu was killed by the pro-Mongol faction using the Sambyeolcho: it marked the end of the military regime.

== Anti-Mongol struggle ==
After the end of military rule in Koryŏ, Wŏnjong decided to heed the Mongol demands to move the capital back to Kaesŏng. By doing so, Wonjong dealt the deathblow to the Koryŏ military's rule and the more than thirty year long war against the Mongols. Despite this, as a concession he had to relocate the Koryo capital back to the mainland, which was within striking distance for the Mongol Yuan armies. The military at the temporary capital on Kanghwa-do Island rejected Wonjong's concessions to the Mongols, as they feared the loss of their influence and that Wonjong would hand over the register of the Sambyeolcho. Knowing they would have no role in Koryo under Mongol influence, they revolted and sought to overthrow Wonjong by placing the Duke of On on the throne.

The Sambyeolcho, led by Pae Chung-son, revolted against the government; systematically blocking passage between Gangwha and the mainland, they brought nearby islands and coastal regions under their domain. They gave up Ganghwa Island and fled to Jindo Island in the southwest.

Although the Sambyeolcho raided the coastlines of Jeolla Province, Jindo Island started to face food shortages by January 1271. In February, the court of Kublai Khan's Yuan dynasty called for the Sambyeolcho's surrender, and by April the Yuan court decided to crush the rebels. While the Sambyeolcho excelled in naval guerilla warfare, their base at Chindo was vulnerable to the Mongol-Koryo force. Led by Mongol commander Hindu, Koryŏ defector Hong Tagu and Kim Panggyong, Chindo was conquered after heavy fighting and the survivors fled. Kim Panggyong reckoned the government army had captured over 10,000 family members and several tens of warships.

After the fall of Chindo, the Sambyeolcho relocated to Tamna, where it was led by Kim Tongjŏng. Due to Tamna's relative inaccessibility, it took two years before it fell. During this period, the Three Extraordinary Watches did everything it could to hamper the military build-up on the mainland by raiding harbors and destroying wharfs, fortifying the island against the inevitable invasion, and trying to warn Japan about the imminent invasion of their land by a combined Mongol-Koryŏ-Song army, while also proposing an alliance with the Kamakura Shogunate.

However, this was ultimately ineffective as the Three Extraordinary Watches had become a large and formal army that needed a stationary base versus its previous heritage as an effective decentralized guerilla army. At the same time, the Yuan did what it could to support Koryŏ in preparing for the invasions. Relief rice (20,000 bushels from the Eastern Capital) was sent to Koryŏ after it reported famine, and Kublai readily agreed to Wŏnjong's entreaty not to allow looting after Tamna had been conquered (which later became an advantage for the Yuan when they occupied the island and raised horses on it).

The Three Extraordinary Watches at Tamna had a vast intelligence network, demonstrated by their efforts to warn the Japanese government of the upcoming Mongol Invasions of Japan. Despite this, on April 11, 1273, a combined army of the Mongol Empire and Koryŏ, aided by a sizeable contingent of North Chinese soldiers, boarded Koryŏ naval vessels and crushed the rebellion. The island was swiftly taken and the Sambyeolcho rebels were killed in battle, executed, or taken prisoner (and executed later). Kim Tongjŏng fled to the slopes of Hallasan accompanied by seventy of his soldiers. He died there two months later, while his soldiers were captured and later executed. With the death of its last leader, the rebellion of the Three Extraordinary Watches had come to an end. Thereafter, the Yuan dynasty directly controlled Tamna until 1294.

== See also ==
- History of Korea
- Mongol invasions of Korea
- Korea under Yuan rule
