= Hong Ta-gu =

Korean Yuan commander (1244–1291)

Korean name
- Hangul: 홍다구
- Hanja: 洪茶丘
Transcriptions
- Revised Romanization: Hong Dagu
- McCune–Reischauer: Hong Tagu

Chinese name
- Traditional Chinese: 洪茶丘
Transcriptions
Standard Mandarin
- Hanyu Pinyin: Hóng Cháqiū

Hong Ta-gu (Korean: 홍다구; Hanja: 洪茶丘; 1244–1291) was a Goryeo commander of the Yuan dynasty. His given name was Chun-gi (俊奇; 준기, Jùnqí), but he was more well known by his courtesy name Ta-gu. Born to a northwestern warlord family that defected to the Mongol Empire, Hong Ta-gu led Goryeo forces who had defected in campaigns against Goryeo and Japan. The Hong family dominated the Goryeo defector families in Liaoyang and Shenyang during the latter half of the 13th century.

== Early life ==
Hong Ta-gu, originally named Chun-gi, was born in 1244 to Hong Pok-wŏn, a northwestern Goryeo warlord who defected to the Mongol Empire in 1231. He entered the military at a young age and managed to impress Kublai, who later became the founder of the Yuan dynasty, with his courage and military prowess. Kublai gave Chun-gi the courtesy name of Ta-gu.

== Mongol service ==
Hong Ta-gu was arrested soon after his father's death in 1260 for trying to provoke conflict between Goryeo and the Mongols by saying that the Goryeo king had lied about his intentions to move the capital back to Kaesong. In 1261, Kublai summoned Hong Ta-gu and told him that his father had been unjustly punished. Hong Ta-gu was made chonggwan of the Goryeo warriors. This was probably due to political considerations. There were a few tens of thousands of Goryeo warriors in Liaoyang and Shenyang, and Kublai demanded their loyalty under threat of punishment for their families.

In 1263, Hong Ta-gu reported that Wang Jun, the Goryeo royal in command of Goryeo families in Shenyang, boasted that his position was no less than that of the heir apparent. Wang Jun's command was stripped and given to Hong.

According to Goryeo sources, Hong "hated his motherland". In 1269, when Im Yon attempted to remove Wonjong from power, Hong received orders to invade Goryeo with 3,300 men. This campaign opened up Goryeo to direct Yuan management of internal affairs and Hong and his Goryeo warriors became one of the primary instruments of such policy for about ten years. In 1270, he was part of the negotiations behind marrying the Goryeo king to a Mongol princess. In 1271, he participated in the suppression of the Sambyeolcho Rebellion with particular zeal. Wang Jun had instructed his sons, who participated in the campaign, to save Wang On, a Goryeo prince who the rebels had named their king. Hong was the first to land on Jindo Island to attack the rebel base and he personally killed Wang On. He also refused to bow to the Goryeo king when he visited court that year. In 1273, Hong carried out the mass slaughter of rebel prisoners when Yuan and Goryeo troops took Tamna, the last stronghold of the Sambyeolcho.

Hong participated in the Mongol invasions of Japan. In April 1274, the Yuan instructed Indü and Hong Ta-gu to mobilize 15,000 men for the invasion of Japan. Hong was put in charge of the construction of large transports and was harsh and cruel in exploiting the Goryeo people for the project. Hong's people looted Goryeo dwellings while preparing for the invasion. In 1277, Goryeo officials reported that food prices rose due to Hong's looting. In 1278, Hong requisitioned rice and beans from western Goryeo. In 1279, a Goryeo envoy reported that the people were distracted by Hong's atrocities. During the actual invasion, one of the three commanding Yuan generals, Liu Fuxiang (Yu-Puk Hyong), was shot in the face by retreating samurai and seriously injured. Liu convened with the other generals Indü and Hong back on his ship. Indü wanted to keep advancing through the night before more Japanese reinforcements arrived, but Hong was worried that their troops were too exhausted and needed rest. There was also fear of being ambushed in the night. Liu agreed with Hong and recalled the Yuan forces back to their ships. Due to a storm, many of the Yuan ships were beached and destroyed. Of the 30,000 strong invasion force, 13,500 did not return. Hong also led the Eastern Route army along with Kim Pang-gyŏng during the second invasion. They disobeyed orders to wait for the Southern Route army and attacked the Japanese mainland by themselves. They failed.

After Hong's failure in Japan, his standing declined. He attacked a popular Goryeo general, Kim Pang-gyŏng, who had fought the Mongols and afterwards sought establishment of friendly ties with the Yuan court. Kim also led Goryeo forces in the Sambyeolcho Rebellion and invasion of Japan, which naturally threatened Hong's position. Hong and Kim ran afoul of each other due to Hong's harsh tendencies during the preparation for the invasion of Japan. When a scandal connected Kim to an alleged plot to have the king murdered, Hong arrested Kim, tortured him, and requested permission from the Yuan court for another campaign against Goryeo. Chungnyeol of Goryeo and Hong were summoned to Khanbaliq, where a discussion took place and Kublai sided with the king. The Mongol troops were called off, the king returned to Goryeo, and Hong's supporters were exiled. After 1281, there are no Goryeo sources about Hong Ta-gu.

== Legacy ==
Historical records provide information about two of Hong Ta-gu's sons: Hong Chung-hŭi and Hong Chung-gyŏng. The History of Yuan says that Chung-hŭi served in the emperor's guard in 1276 and in 1279, he inherited his father's position as Commander of Goryeo Warriors. He visited Goryeo in 1284 as a Yuan envoy and brought horses to the king as a present. Jung-gyong participated in putting down the rebellion of the Mongol prince Nayan in 1287. In 1306, he was appointed Pyongjang chongsa of Liaoyang instead of his uncle, Hong Kun-sang.

Both sons inherited their father's hatred of Goryeo. In 1302, the Hong clan proposed combining Liaoyang and the Branch Secretariat for Eastern Campaigns (Goryeo). When Chungseon of Goryeo came to power in 1309, both brothers criticized his administrative reforms and proposed sending warriors from Shenyang to cut lumber in the Paektu Mountain region to provoke conflict. Between 1309 and 1312, the Hong brothers proposed establishing a province in Goryeo instead of having a separate kingdom. Chung-hŭi argued that it was unreasonable for one person to sit on two thrones at the same time, referring to Chungseon's position as both king of Goryeo and Wang of Shenyang. The Wang of Shenyang was created in 1260 to rule Goryeo people living in Shenyang. While real power resided in the Hong clan and other families, the symbolic power of the post occupied by the Goryeo royal family provided an alternative center of power among the Goryeo elite. In 1308, Külüg Khan granted the post to Chungseon. Chungseon also benefited from three rest stop villages established by Kublai in 1279 between Goryeo and Khanbaliq that became his base for expansion into Liaoyang. He was granted lands on the northern bank of the Yalu and gained significant influence over the region. The emperor rejected the proposal to turn Goryeo into a province in 1312. The Hong clan lost most of its power and the brothers are not mentioned again after 1312.

Some of their relatives stayed in Goryeo and obtained relatively high positions there but played no significant role in Goryeo-Yuan relations. Hong Ta-gu's younger brother, Hong Kun-sang (? – 1309) was a diplomat between Goryeo-Yuan. Hong Pok-wŏn's brother, Hong Baek-su and his family: son Hong Son (? – 1380), grandsons Hong T'ak, Hong Su, Hong Ik, Hong Myoungleehwasang. They were purged in 1356 by Gongmin of Goryeo.

== See also ==
- History of China
- History of Korea
- Manchuria under Yuan rule

== Bibliography ==
- Delgado, James P. (2010). Khubilai Khan's Lost Fleet: In Search of a Legendary Armada.
- Lo, Jung-pang (2012), China as a Sea Power 1127-1368
- Turnbull, Stephen (2003). Genghis Khan and the Mongol Conquests, 1190–1400. London: Taylor & Francis. ISBN 978-0-415-96862-1.
- Turnbull, Stephen (2010). The Mongol Invasions of Japan 1274 and 1281. Osprey.
