= Namdo Field Songs =

South Korean folk choral songs

Namdo Field Songs (hangeul: 남도 들노래; romanisation: Namdo deulnorae) refers to a set of South Korean folk choral songs used by farmers in rice fields, specifically in the region of Jeolla Province. The Namdo Field Songs have been recognised as part of the Intangible Cultural Property of the Republic of Korea in 1973.

== Origin and type of field songs ==
Namdo Field Songs are folk songs (in Korean: minyo) originated and widespread in the Jeolla Province region, more precisely in the Western area of South Jeolla, in the basin of the Yeonsang River: the name Namdo means “South path” and can be also written with the ideograms 南道, whose literal translation is “Southern road”. Although now known all over the country, the words and sounds may vary by region and are sung mainly by the residents of the Jindo Island and Inji-ri. The songs were first discovered and catalogued by the folklorist Ji Chunsang in 1970 while visiting the Jindo Island, and they are generally referred to as part of Labour Songs typical of the whole region, as they were sung and considered essential by farmers while working in the rice fields with the intent of forgetting the tiredness and giving strength to one another. In order to do so, the stanzas that composed the songs have a rhythmic cycle that matched the different phases of the activities in the rice fields and the words were partly improvised to keep the workers attentive and entertained.

The sets of songs that compose the Namdo Field Songs can be divided into:

- Songs about steaming rice seeds (also known as Mojjineun Songs – hangeul: 모찌는 노래 – or Sangsa Sori – hangeul: 상사소리);
- Songs about planting and transplanting rice plants (also known as Mosimgi Songs – hangeul: 모심기 노래), which have a bright and lively rhythm and are meant to give strength to the farmers and can become faster when used to rush the workers;
- Songs about weeding the fields by removing wild seaweeds (also known as Jeollo Sori – hangeul: 절로소리), which have a slower and duller rhythm;
- Songs about the ending of the work in the fields when going back to the storehouse (also known as Jangwonjil Sori – hangeul: 장원질 소리) that are sung after the last paddy of rice has dried and therefore have a triumphant rhythm. These last batch of songs can be heard during processions in the neighbourhood, where the rice is put on a cow adorned with vines and directed towards the house of the hardest worker, who will then offer food and alcoholic drinks.

For this reason, Namdo Field Songs can also be divided into wet paddy songs (those used when steaming, planting and weeding) and dry fields songs (Jangwonjil Sori).

In the past, the rhythm was marked by drums played by the band, which stayed at the borders of the rice field during the whole harvesting cycle while the farmers were bent down wearing white or brown clothes and singing the stanzas as a team. Because of the high improvisation rate, each song had a variable duration and even the framework could change depending on the specific situation such as the fertility of the soil due to the necessity of harmonizing the melody with the work pace in the paddy. The particularity of Namdo Field Songs lies within their sounds and notes which cannot be found in any other part of inland South Korea – also, as a consequence of the strong accents of their spoken Korean consequently to the isolated position of the region surrounded by the mountains.

== Standardisation in the modern era ==
Although these songs belong to the tradition of South Korea, with the nomination of Namdo Field Songs as an Intangible Cultural Property in 1971 and the win of the 12th National Folk Contest in October of the same year some changes have been made in order to reach a conventional standardisation. First, improvisation was reduced to a minimum in order to make each stanza more regular and known outside the local area, making it easier for performers to sing them. This gives a more repetitive frame to the songs, which are also perceived as historically accurate and descriptive of a past habit. The songs also lost part of their choral aspects which were meant to generate cohesion among the farmers, as the stanzas are now mostly sung by a performance leader who shows off his skills, followed by a chorus. Furthermore, the rhythm of the songs is now marked by a single drummer which stands in front of the workers, who are dressed in bright colours. These last particulars have stirred up some controversies among the Korean populations, as they pointed out that, in that position in a real situation, the drummer would have ruined the field by stomping on the growing plants before the farmers could pick them up. Sometimes, a choreography is designed ex novo for show purposes and then added to the performance.

These changes were meant to cater to the audience of outsiders during the festivals and preserve the cultural heritage throughout the modern days, but they could also be linked to the feeling of inferiority these songs bring with themselves: as they were sung by farmers, Namdo Field Songs are considered to be connected to poverty and past times when industrialisation was absent: when asked, in the past informants would pretend to not know those songs or their existence. However, during festivals the songs are still performed by natives of the Jeolla-do region, especially from the Jindo Island whose creativity is showcased through the variety of these songs.

== Conservation and heritage ==
After their discovery and the nomination in 1971, Namdo Field Songs have been designated as the National Intangible Cultural Property n.51 by the Government on the 5th of November 1973 and are now under a strict conservation policy of the government. Those who standardised them and pushed for their recognition, Seol Jaechon and Jo Gongrye, became their holders until their death in 1997, immediately substituted by Kim Youngja and Park Dongmae.
