= Battle of Cheoin =

1232 battle in Korea

Battle of Cheoinseong Fortress
- Part of the Mongol invasions of Korea
| Date | December 16, 1232 |
| Location | Yongin, South Korea |
| Result | Goryeo victory |

Belligerents
| Goryeo militants | Mongol Empire |

Commanders and leaders
| Kim Yun-hu | Saritai †; Hong Pok-wŏn |

Strength
| 100 monk soldiers 1,000 refugees | Unknown |

Casualties and losses
| Unknown | Unknown |

- Korean name
- Hangul: 처인성 전투
- Hanja: 處仁城 戰鬪
- RR: Cheoinseong jeontu
- MR: Ch'ŏinsŏng chŏnt'u

The Battle of Cheoin was a battle between Goryeo militants and forces of the Mongol Empire in Cheoin-bugok, Suju, Yanggwang-do (modern day Yongin, Gyeonggi) on December 16, 1232. Despite being outnumbered, civilian forces of the fortress managed to hold off the Mongol advance. Following the death of the Mongolian general Saritai, the invading force withdrew, effectively ending the second Mongol invasion of Korea.

== Background ==
In August 1232, in response to the Goryeo military government's relocation to Ganghwado, the Mongol Empire began its second invasion of Korea. After conquering Gaegyeong and Hanyang, Saritai, supreme commander of the invading Mongol forces, initially planned an amphibious invasion of the island. However, he later decided on an advance further south. The Mongol army reached Gwangju in November but failed to take over its fortress. Saritai then ordered most of his forces to resume its blockade on Ganghwado and continued his advance south with the rest of his troops until he arrived at the village of Cheoin.

Cheoin was then a bugok, a segregational administration where cheonmin peasants made up the majority of the population. As the village itself was relatively small and had little strategic value, it was left undefended by regular forces. Hence, its local fortification, Cheoinseong fortress, was small and earthen, with a circumference of about 425m. Around 1,000 civilians were sheltered at the fortress, along with a group of roughly 100 monk soldiers.

== Development ==
Nevertheless, Saritai began preparations for a siege and split his forces surrounding Cheoinseong fortress, presumably seeking a quick takeover of its supply storage and human resources. The people of the fortress decided to fight against the Mongols and nominated monk soldier Kim Yun-hu as commander. Saritai initiated his attack on December 16, but failed to take over the fortress and was ambushed by guerilla forces that had been waiting on a hill nearby its eastern gate. The same day, Saritai was fatally hit by an arrow, presumably fired by a monk archer who was stationed inside the fortress. After his death, Mongol forces collapsed and were forced to retreat.

== Aftermath ==
The battle of Cheoin became a major turning point in the war. As Mongol forces became disorganized, the war turned in Goryeo's favor. The Mongol Empire concluded a peace treaty with Goryeo and withdrew its troops.

The Goryeo government later offered Kim Yun-hu a promotion in his government position, crediting him as the man who shot the Mongol general. However, Kim refused the offer, claiming that he did not possess a bow and an arrow during the battle. Nevertheless, the Goryeosa recognizes him as the man who shot Saritai, and he is widely acknowledged as so. Kim Yun-hu participated again in battle 21 years later at the Battle of Chungju, during the fifth Mongol invasion of Korea.

Cheoin-bugok was later promoted to a hyeon and was freed from its former segregational status.
