= Tongnyŏng Prefectures =

Yuan dynasty prefectures in the Korean Peninsula

Chinese name
- Traditional Chinese: 東寧府
Transcriptions

Korean name
- Hangul: 동녕부
- Hanja: 東寧府
Transcriptions
- Revised Romanization: Dongnyeongbu
- McCune–Reischauer: Tongnyŏngbu

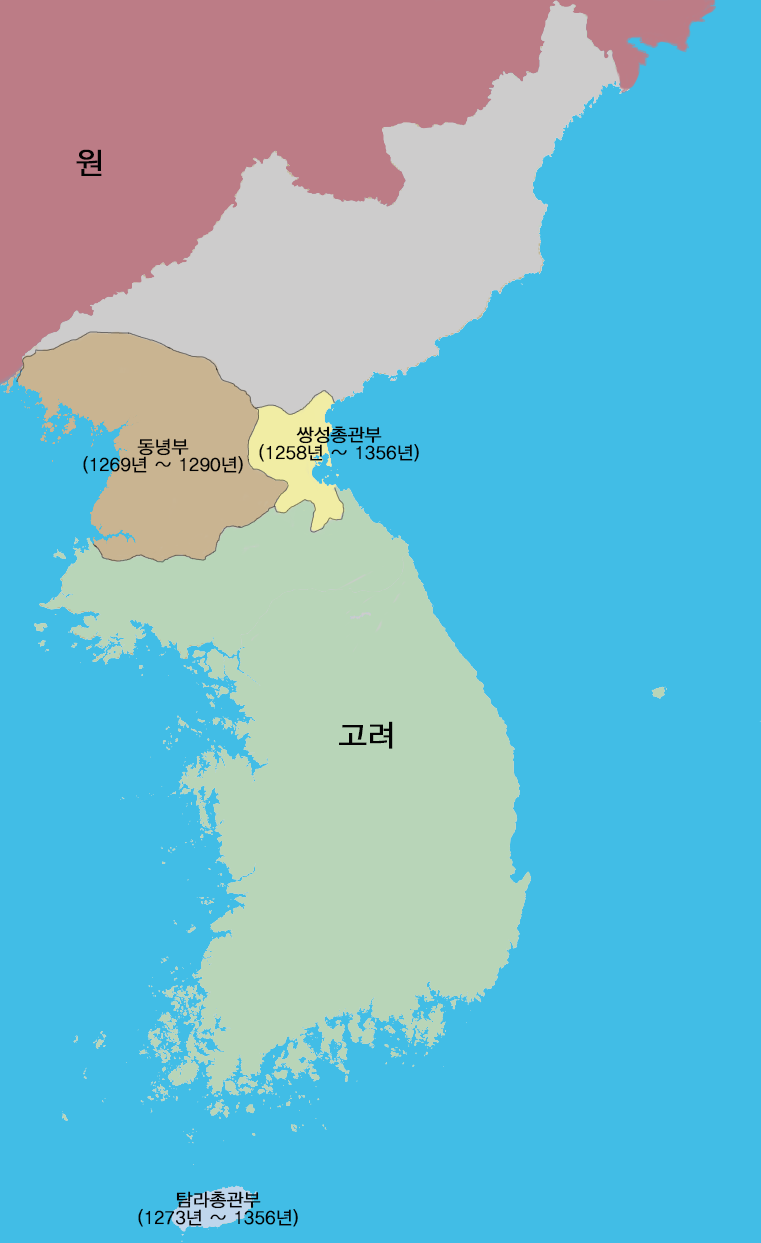
Tongnyŏng prefectures, highlighted in Brown.

Tongnyŏng Prefectures (Korean: 동녕부; Hanja: 東寧府) were administrative divisions of the Mongol-led Yuan dynasty of China located in the northwest Korean Peninsula between 1269 and 1290.

== History ==
In October 1269, Ch'oe T'an (최탄; 崔坦), Han Sin (한신; 韓慎), Yi Yŏnnyŏng (이연령; 李延齡), Kye Munbi (계문비; 桂文庇) and Hyŏn Hyoch'ŏl (현효철; 玄孝哲) rose in rebellion in order to exclude Im Yŏn (임연; 林衍), Military Leader of Goryeo, and surrendered to Yuan dynasty with 60 prefectures and cities in northwest part of Goryeo. In following year, Yuan dynasty established Tonggyŏng prefecture at former west prefecture. Jabi Pass (자비령; 慈悲嶺) as a border belonged to Liaoyang ministry nominated Ch'oe T'an as a commander.

In 1276, Tonggyŏng prefecture got promoted to Tonggyŏng circuit. This promotion there was no description in the Koryŏsa. Also in the clause of August 1276 and February 1290, the description of Tonggyŏng prefecture can be seen. It is inferred that "Tonggyŏng circuit" was renamed as "Tonggyŏng prefecture" shortly.

After this, the political relationship between Yuan dynasty and Goryeo was strengthen. In July 1290, Tonggyŏng prefecture was abolished and jurisdiction was transferred to Goryeo, ending the prefecture's 20 years of history.

== Controversy ==
In Koryŏsa, there were some records (New year's clause in 1364, November's clause in 1369 and new year's clause in 1370) tells that Tonggyŏng prefecture was established in Yuan dynasty again. However, there were no descriptions about Tonggyŏng prefecture in China's records after 1290. In the end of Yuan dynasty, it suddenly appeared in Koryŏsa. There are two hypotheses about this. One is that in 1290, Tonggyŏng prefecture was not abolished but transferred to Liaoyang area. And the other was that Tonggyŏng prefecture was abolished in 1290, but reestablished in Yuan dynasty in the period of confusion.

== See also ==
- Korea under Yuan rule
- Ssangseong Prefectures
- Tamna prefectures
