= Pae Chung-son =

Korean general (fl. 13th century)

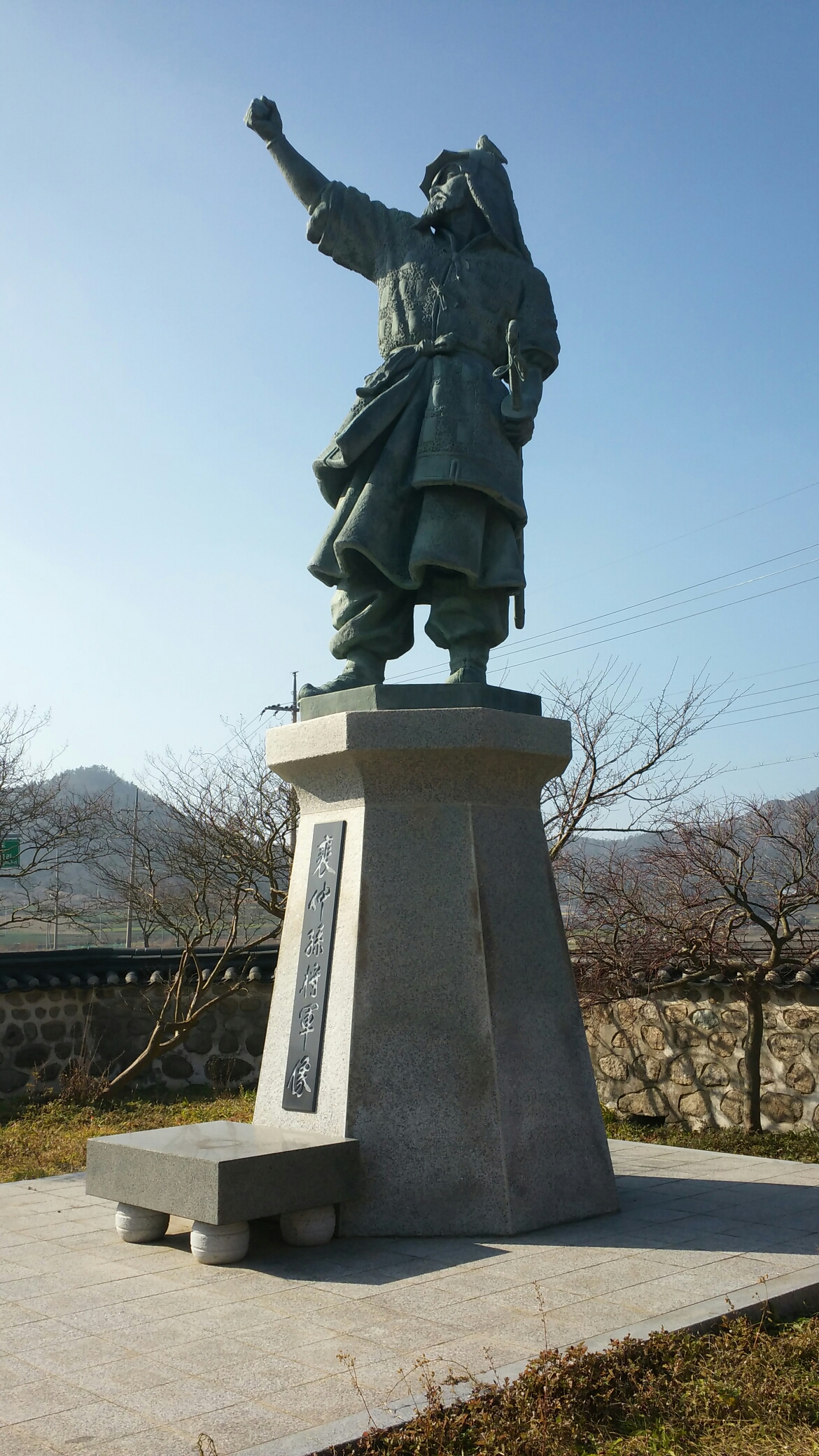

Korean name
- Hangul: 배중손
- Hanja: 裵仲孫
- RR: Bae Jungson
- MR: Pae Chungson

Pae Chung-son (Korean: 배중손; Hanja: 裵仲孫, ? – 1271) is one of the generals who led Sambyeolcho for a few months after Wonjong moved to Gaegyeong.

== Life ==
Pae Chung-son was opposed to surrendering to the Mongol Yuan dynasty in China. On May 23, 1270 when the King of Goryeo Wonjong decided to return to Gaegyeong (now Gaeseong) from Ganghwa Island, he opposed and refused it. So king Wonjong ordered disbandment of Sambyeolcho, but he refused it, too and started a rebellion. Then he moved Sambyeolcho from Ganghwa Island to Jindo Island on June 3, 1270, and continued being opposed to the Mongols. But he died April, 1271 when Goryeo – Mongol allies invaded and occupied Jindo Island.

== After he died ==
Some survivors such as Kim T'ong-jŏng escaped Ganghwa Island and moved to Jeju Island, but they vanished at 1273 by Goryeo-Mongolian allies. That was the end of Sambyeolcho.
