= Tamna Prefecture =

Chinese name
- Traditional Chinese: 耽羅摠管府
Transcriptions

Korean name
- Hangul: 탐라총관부
- Hanja: 耽羅摠管府
Transcriptions
- Revised Romanization: Tamna Chonggwanbu
- McCune–Reischauer: T'amna Ch'onggwanbu

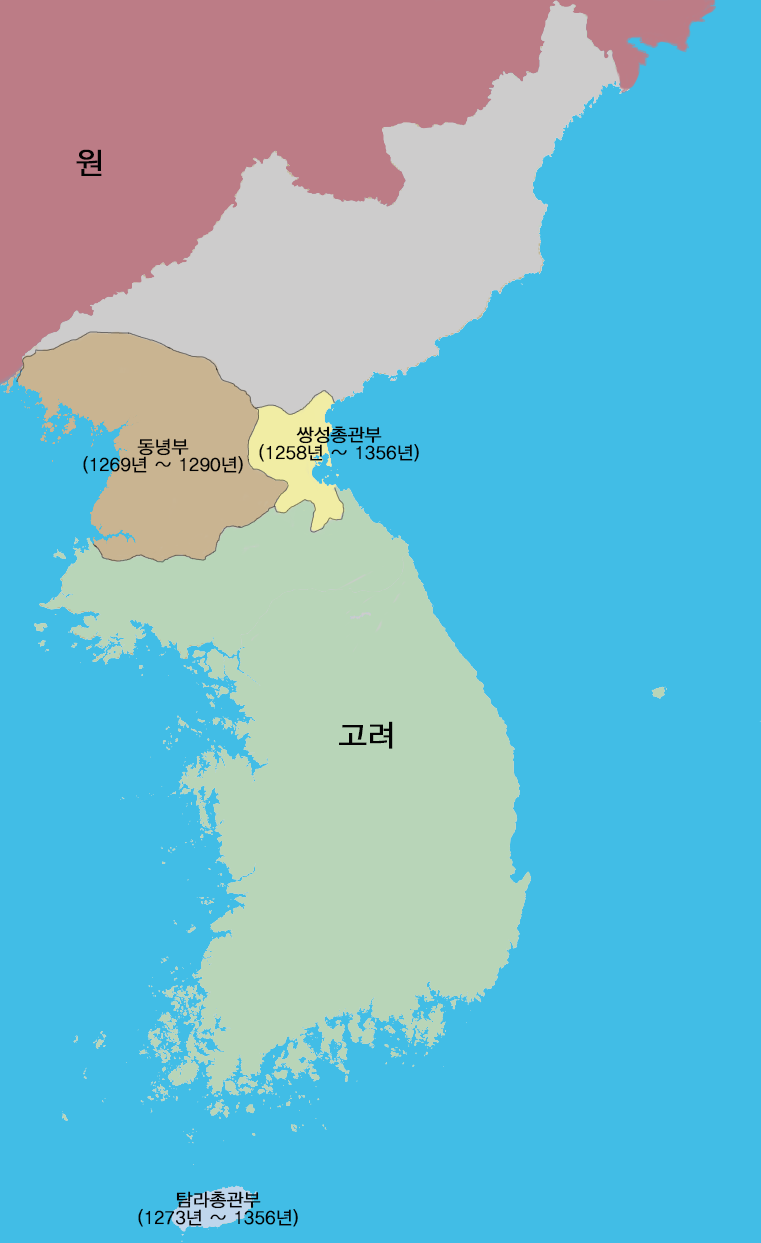
Tamna prefecture, highlighted in Blue.

Tamna Prefecture (Chinese: 耽羅摠管府; Korean: 탐라총관부) is administrative division of the Yuan dynasty established after the Sambyeolcho Rebellion and before 1275 in modern-day Jeju Province.

== History ==
After the Sambyeolcho Rebellion was crushed by the Yuan authorities, the Tamna Occupation Department (耽羅國招討司)' was established in 1273. The exact establishment of the prefecture is unknown, however it is generally thought to be some time before 1275 based on the records of its first darughachi sent to the region in 1275. Its original name was the Military and Civilian Darughachi Administrative Prefecture of Tamna (Korean: 탐라국군민도다루가치총관부; Hanja: 耽羅國軍民都達魯花赤摠管府; RR: tamnaguk-gumindo-darugachi-chonggwanbu). In 1277, the first stable to raise the horses to meet the need for the Yuan dynasty were established and 160 horses were brought to the region for the project.

The prefecture was abolished after the Tamna Pacification Department (耽羅國安撫司) was established in 1284, and in 1300 it was re-established as Tamna Military & Civilian Prefecture (Korean: 탐라군민총관부; RR: tamnagunminchonggwanbu).

In 1301, from Goryeo for Tamna to be placed under its jurisdiction led to the region becoming Tamna Manhobu (Korean: 탐라만호부; Hanja: 탐라萬戶府) until 1356. A manho (萬戶) was equivalent to ten thousand households or soldiers.
