= Cho Hwi =

Korean politician (fl. 13th century)

- Hangul: 조휘
- Hanja: 趙暉
- RR: Jo Hwi
- MR: Cho Hwi

Cho Hwi (Korean: 조휘; Hanja: 趙暉) was a Korean soldier who originally served Goryeo but defected to the Mongol Empire in 1259. Appointed by the Mongols as the General Superintendent of the Ssangsŏng Prefecture, created from the former northeastern territory of Goryeo seized by the Mongols, Cho Hwi and his descendants would maintain hereditary rule over the prefecture until its reconquest by Goryeo nearly a century later in 1356.

== Biography ==
Cho Hwi was a native of Yongjin-hyŏn, Goryeo (modern-day Munchon, North Korea). He was the son of Cho Chisu (조지수; 趙之壽), the progenitor of the Hanyang Cho clan. In January 1259 (Note: In the Korean calendar (lunisolar), the 12th month of the 45th year (1258) of Kojong's reign.), the Mongols invaded Goryeo's northeastern region of Tongbungmyŏn. Tongbungmyŏn military commissioner Sin Chipp'yŏng (신집평; 慎執平) attempted to move civilians who had fled to Chŏdo (저도; 楮島) to Chukto (죽도; 竹島). Chukto was narrower than Chŏdo and had no wells. In response to Sin's actions, Cho Hwi, along with T'ak Ch'ŏng (탁청; 卓青) led a rebellion, killing Sin Chipp'yŏng and other Goryeo officials. They then surrendered all Goryeo territory north of Hwaju to the Mongols. On January 9, 1259 (Note: In the Korean calendar (lunisolar), the 14th day of the 12th month of the 45th year (1258) of Kojong's reign.), the Mongols created Ssangsŏng Prefecture, appointing Cho as the General Superintendent (총관; 摠管; ch'onggwan) and T'ak as a chiliarch.

As the General Superintendent, Cho took a hostile stance against Goryeo. When Goryeo sent Junior Colonel (낭장; 郎將; nangjang) Kim Kisŏng (김기성; 金器成) as an envoy to the Mongols, 30 of Cho's men killed the Goryeo envoys at Munju. He aided Mongol forces on an attack against the Goryeo fort of Han'gye (한계성; 寒溪城) but was repulsed by Special Supervisor of Defense (방호별감; 防護別監; panghobyŏlgam) An Hongmin (안홍민; 安洪敏). In 1271, Cho helped rebels in the Yangju capture the local magistrate. Cho was succeeded as the General Superintendent of the Ssangsŏng Prefecture by his son, Cho Yanggi (조양기; 趙良琪).
