= Sambyeolcho =

Military unit of the Goryeo dynasty

- Hangul: 삼별초
- Hanja: 三別抄
- RR: Sambyeolcho
- MR: Sambyŏlch'o

The Sambyeolcho, or the Three Extraordinary Watches, was a military unit of the Goryeo dynasty while the Ch'oe family held the reins of power as military dictators behind puppet kings. They played a key role in resisting the Mongol Invasions of Korea.

== History ==
Meaning "specially-selected troops", the Sambyeolcho originated from a unit called the Yabyeolcho (야별초, 夜別抄, Special Night Unit), which was established to prevent burglaries and to provide night time security in the capital. When additional units were subordinated to the Yabyeolcho, the new organization was divided into two main units, the Jwabyeolcho (좌별초, 左別抄), Special Unit of the Left, and the Ubyeolcho (우별초, 右別抄), the Special Unit of the Right.

When a number of soldiers had been taken prisoner by the Mongols and then escaped, they were organized into a third force, the Sinuigun (신의군, 神義軍), and these three came to be known collectively as the Sambyeolcho. The Sambyeolcho performed both police and military functions but were elements of the private army of the Ch'oe family. Ch'oe U's private armies superseded and replaced the royal armies. The Sambyeolcho together with the Dobang (도방, 都房) comprised the means by which the Ch'oe family military dictators projected their power after their military coup usurped the royal power. The Sambyeolcho were disbanded when the Goryeo military regime collapsed.

The Sambyeolcho rose in rebellion in 1270 to protest against the strong ambition of the government. After establishing its own government and fighting for three years against the government, the rebellion was crushed by the Korean-Mongolian alliance in 1273.

== Legacy ==
Historian Remco Breuker attributes the relative success of the Koryõ resistance against the Mongols as a direct consequence of the decentralized structure and guerilla tactics of the Sambyeolcho as well as the forced retreat of the population to mountain fortresses and coastal islands to safeguard the people for tax purposes. Breuker writes that this new strategy turned out to be highly successful (if also very costly in all respects). Despite six massively destructive invasions, the Mongol armies never conquered Koryö. That the absorption of Koryö into the Yuan Empire only became possible after internal conditions in Koryö made further war with the Yuan politically undesirable for king and court and emphatically not after Koryö had been forced to its knees manu militari. After forty years of intermittent warfare, a peace treaty was concluded that returned the Koryö royal house to the nexus of power, while providing the final blow for military rule in Koryö. This was done in spite of the fierce resistance mounted by the Sambyeolcho and the establishment of a short-lived rival state and dynasty to Koryö and its ruling house. The Extraordinary Watch as a military unit remained and survived during late Koryo to become part of Chosõn military history.
