= Ssangsŏng Prefecture =

13th to 14th century Yuan administrative division in Korea

Korean name
- Hangul: 쌍성총관부
- Hanja: 雙城摠管府
Transcriptions
- Revised Romanization: Ssangseong Chonggwanbu
- McCune–Reischauer: Ssangsŏng Ch'onggwanbu

Chinese name
- Traditional Chinese: 雙城摠管府
Transcriptions

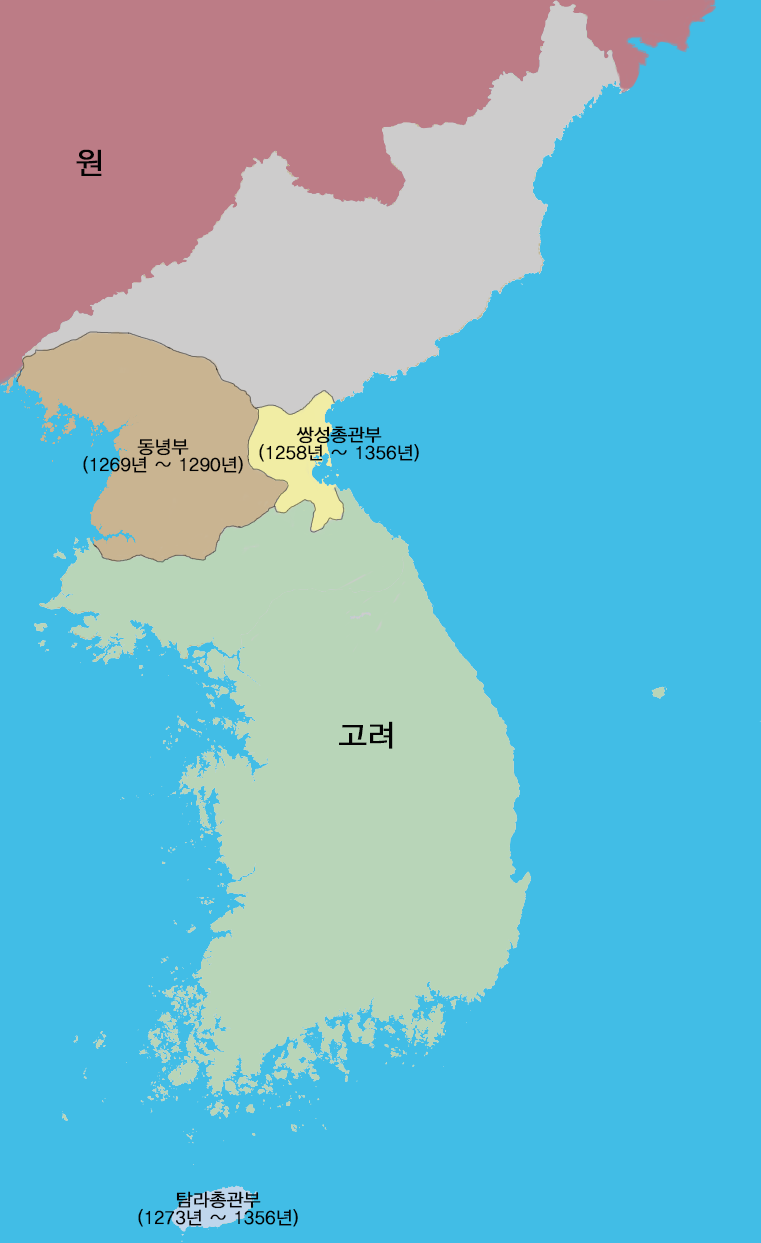
Ssangsŏng prefectures, highlighted in Yellow.

Ssangsŏng Prefecture (Korean: 쌍성총관부; Chinese: 雙城摠管府) was an administrative division of the Yuan dynasty established in 1258 in modern-day Kumya County, South Hamgyong Province, North Korea. It was founded as a base for conquest and domination of northern Goryeo territory together with the Dongnyeong Prefectures, which had jurisdiction over southern Jabi (자비; 慈悲) pass. In 1356, Gongmin of Goryeo got out under the influence of Yuan dynasty, attacked Yuan dynasty together with Dongnyeong Prefectures and restored the land.

== Installation ==
In 1258, Yuan dynasty general San Gil (산길; 散吉) and Bo Ji (보지; 普只) invaded northeastern Goryeo along with the eastern Jurchen. Tongbungmyŏn military commissioner Sin Chipp'yŏng (신집편; 慎執平) forcibly removed civilians who took refugee on Jeodo island (저도; 楮島) to Jukdo island in Tŏkwon. However, Cho Hwi and T'ak Ch'ŏng (탁청; 卓青) killed Pak Ingi (박인기; 朴仁起), governor of Deungju, and Kim Sŏnbo (김선보; 金宣甫), governor of Hwaju, and then Sin Chip-p'yŏng. They then surrendered the land north of Cheollyeong Pass (철령; 鐵嶺) to Yuan dynasty. The Yuan then established the Ssangsŏng prefecture to govern the northeast. At that time, Cho Hwi was nominated as the General Superintendent (총관; 摠管) and T'ak Ch'ŏng was nominated as a chiliarch. Afterwards, the position of General Superintendent was inherited by Cho family. After Jo Hwi, the position was inherited by Cho Yanggi (조양기; 趙良琪) who was the son of Cho Hwi, Cho Rim (조림; 趙琳), grandchild of Cho Hwi and Cho Sosaeng (조소생; 趙小生) who was a great-grandchild of Cho Hwi. The position of chiliarch was also inherited by T'ak family.

On the other hand, Ch'oe Tan who made a rebellion in 1269, devoted 54 castles including Seogyeong and 6 castles including Seohae province to Yuan dynasty. Yuan dynasty renamed Seogyeong as Dongnyeong Prefecture and incorporated to their own territory. This decision has made regardless of Yuan dynasty's invasion.

After that, Goryeo came to fall to the position of receiving the original interference.

== Fall ==
Ssangsŏng prefecture fell to Goryeo in 1356. Yu Inu (유인우; 柳仁雨) who was a vice-minister of councilors became an officer for northeast troop and was commanded to seize control of Ssangsŏng prefecture by King Gongmin of Goryeo. He was sent to the front together with general of battalion Kong Pubo (공부보; 貢夫甫), Kim Wonbŏng (김원봉; 金元鳳) and Yi Inim (이인임; 李仁任). Cho Ton (조돈; 趙暾), the uncle of General Superintendent Cho Sosaeng, and Yi Chach'un, the myriach of Hamju, sided with Goryeo and helped Goryeo take control of Ssangsŏng. General Superintendent Cho Sosaeng fled northwards and took shelter amongst the Jurchen.

== General Superintendents of Ssangsŏng Prefecture ==
1. Cho Hwi
2. Cho Yanggi
3. Cho Rim
4. Cho Sosaeng

== See also ==
- Korea under Yuan rule
- Dongnyeong Prefectures
- Tamna prefectures
