= Jindo (island) =

Island in southwest South Korea

- Panoramic view of Jindo
- Interactive map of Jindo

Geography
- Location: Yellow Sea, East China Sea
- Coordinates: 34°28′59″N 126°15′43″E
- Area: 363.16 km^{2} (140.22 sq mi)
- Highest elevation: 485 m (1591 ft)
- Highest point: Cheomchal

Administration
- South Korea
- Province: South Jeolla
- Largest settlement: Jindo County

Demographics
- Ethnic groups: Korean

Korean name
- Hangul: 진도
- Hanja: 珍島
- RR: Jindo
- MR: Chindo

Jindo (Korean: 진도) is the third largest island in South Korea. Together with a group of much smaller islands, it forms Jindo County.

It is located in South Jeolla province, just off the southwest corner of the Korean Peninsula. The island is separated from the mainland by the Myeongnyang Strait; however, this strait is now spanned by South Korea's longest cable-stayed bridge spanning 484 meters. Here in 1597 admiral Yi Sun-sin won the Battle of Myeongnyang, defeating a vastly superior Japanese fleet.

Every year, on a variable day in the spring or summer, a narrow land pass (about 2.9 km long and up to 40 meters wide) opens for about an hour between the main Jindo Island and small Modo island as a result of tidal activity. This event attracts hundreds of thousands of tourists and is accompanied by local festivals.

== History ==
The island was known and inhabited since prehistoric time. In 995, it was called Haeyangdo, and later renamed to Okju county and became one of the 14 Korean states. In 1001, the island Okju was changed to Jindo. During the Mongol invasions of Korea of 1231–1270, the island served as a refuge for the Sambyeolcho Rebellion forces. However, in 1271, Mongols captured the island and removed all settlements from there. The population that returned after the Mongol invasion was constantly threatened by Japanese pirates invasions, and thus the island was nearly empty during the 14th century.

On 16 September 1597, during the Seven Year War, the Korean admiral Yi Sun-sin achieved a decisive victory in the Battle of Myeongnyang held at the Myeongnyang Strait. With 13 panokseons and about 200 men he defeated the Japanese fleet of 133 warships and 200 support ships. During the lifetime of Yi Sun-sin, the strait was also known as 'Uldolmok,' or 'the Roaring Channel,' most likely due to the powerful tidal forces in the channel, which were especially loud in spring.

== Mascot ==
Jindo dog, a native dog of Korea, is a mascot and is a breed from Jindo-gun.

== Myeongnyang Strait ==
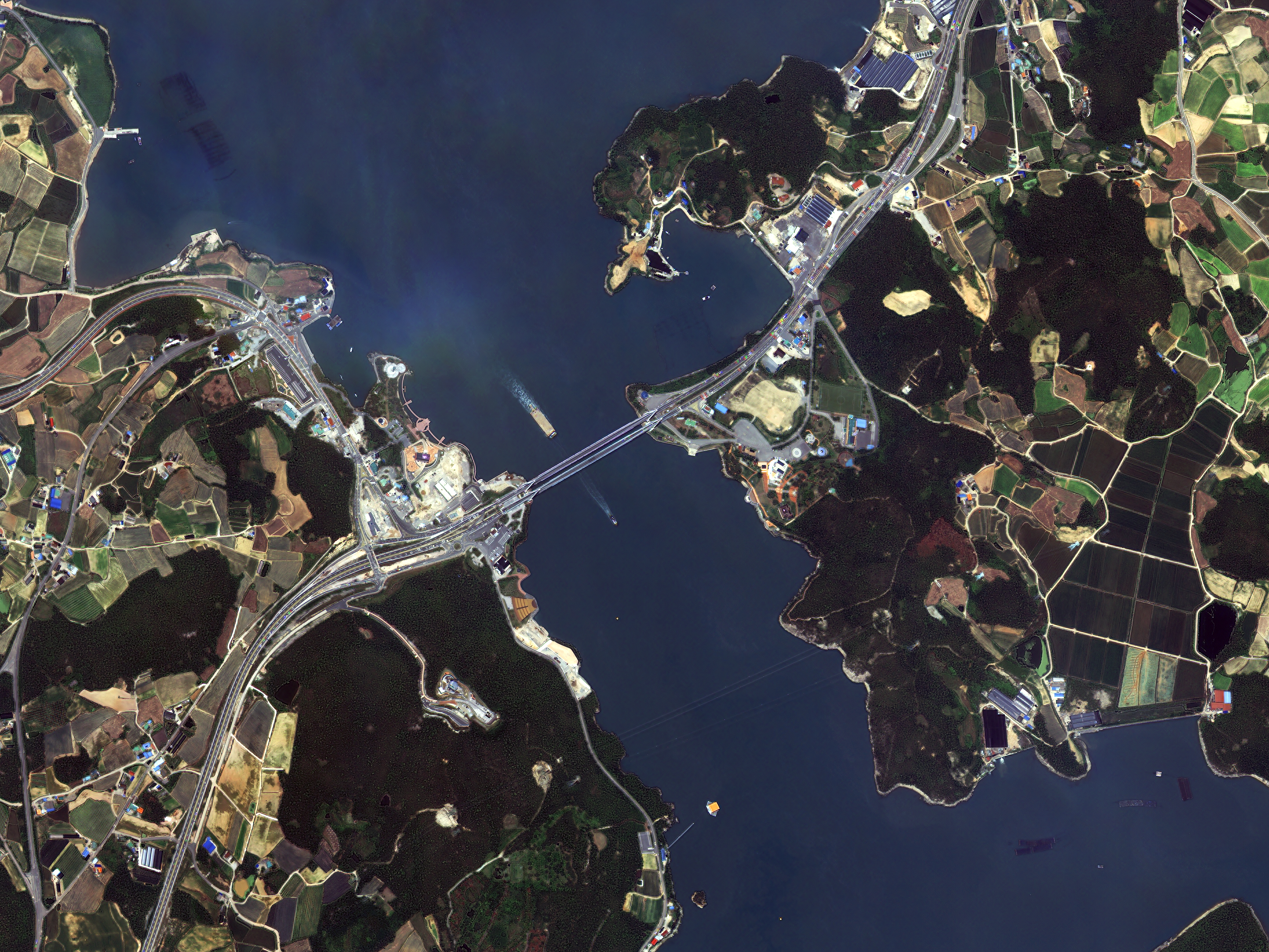
Satellite view of the strait (2020)

The Myeongnyang Strait (명량해협; 鳴梁海峽; Myeongnyang haehyeop; Myŏngnyang haehyŏp; 'screaming sea') separates Jindo Island and Jindo County from Haenam County on the mainland. At its narrowest point, the strait is about 300 meters wide and up to 22 meters deep, with the tide variations up to 6 meters in spring. The tidal currents reach up to 6 m/s and are considered as the fastest in Asia. Combined with a whirlpool in the strait, these fast tides hinder navigation. The area is frequently hit by typhoons with typical average wind speeds of 48 m/s. The coastline is very irregular and contains numerous minor valleys, mountains and islets. The shores are steep and are made by eroding igneous and volcanic rocks. There is significant navigation in the strait.

== Jindo Bridge ==
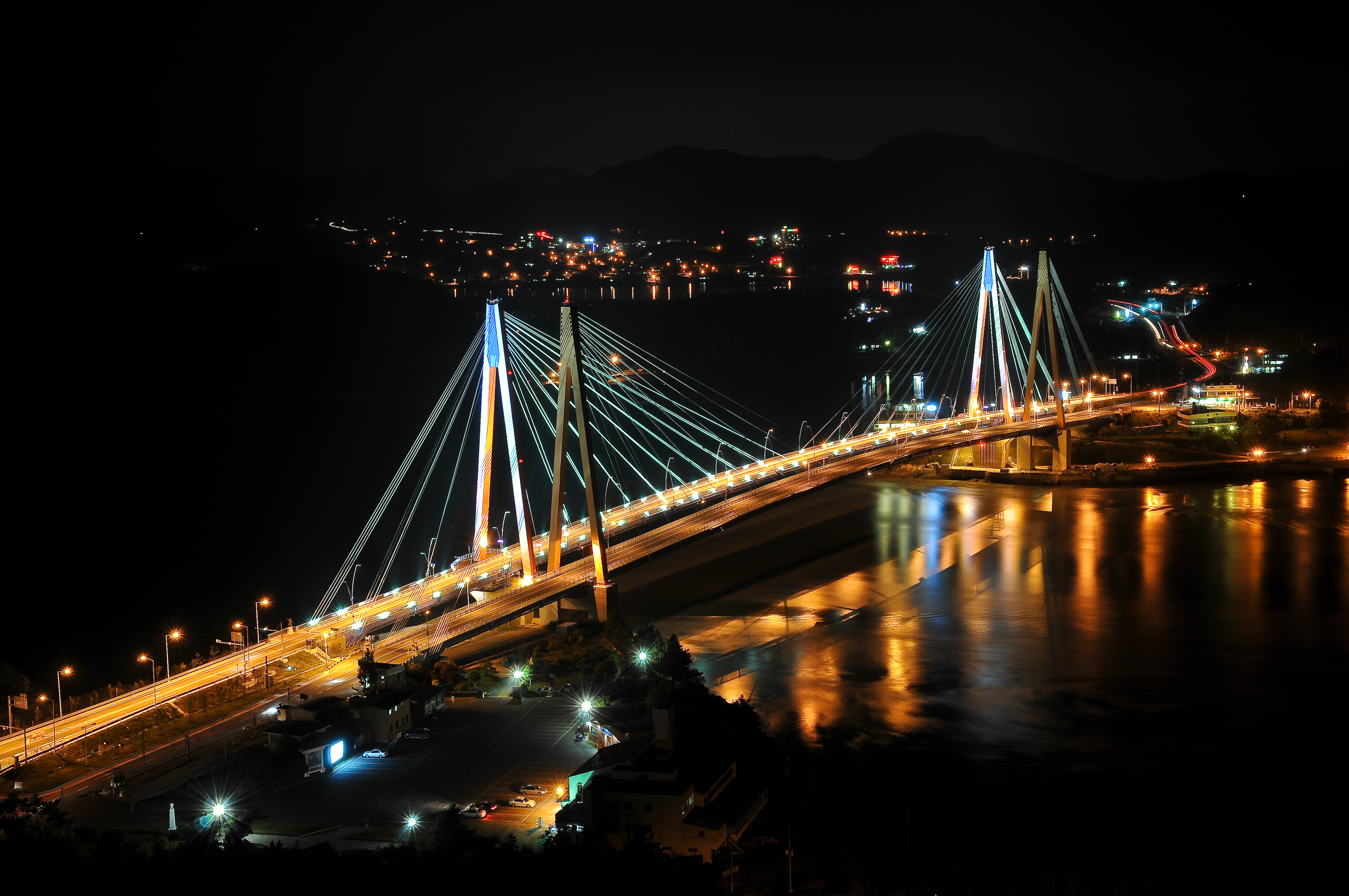
The twin Jindo Bridge

A twin bridge, consisting of two cable-stayed bridges of very similar design, connect Jindo Island with the mainland, and its shape is reflected in the logo of the Jindo County. The first Jindo Bridge was opened on 18 October 1984. It has the main span of 344 m and two side spans of 70 m making the total length of 484 m at a width of only 11.7 m. At the time of its opening, it was the world's longest and narrowest suspension bridge. A 200-meter part under the bridge is open for major navigation for ships with ceiling below 20 meters. The increase in local traffic meant the government needed to add the second bridge in 2005, which is of the same length, but wider at 12.5 meters.

== Tourist activities ==
A medium-sized hunting dog breed called the Korean Jindo Dog (진돗개; 珍島개) is indigenous to the island. It is known in Korea for its fierce loyalty, attachment to home and its hunting abilities. Since 1936, the dog has been considered as a national cultural legacy and has been protected during the war times. There is a Jindo Dog Research and Testing Center on the island.

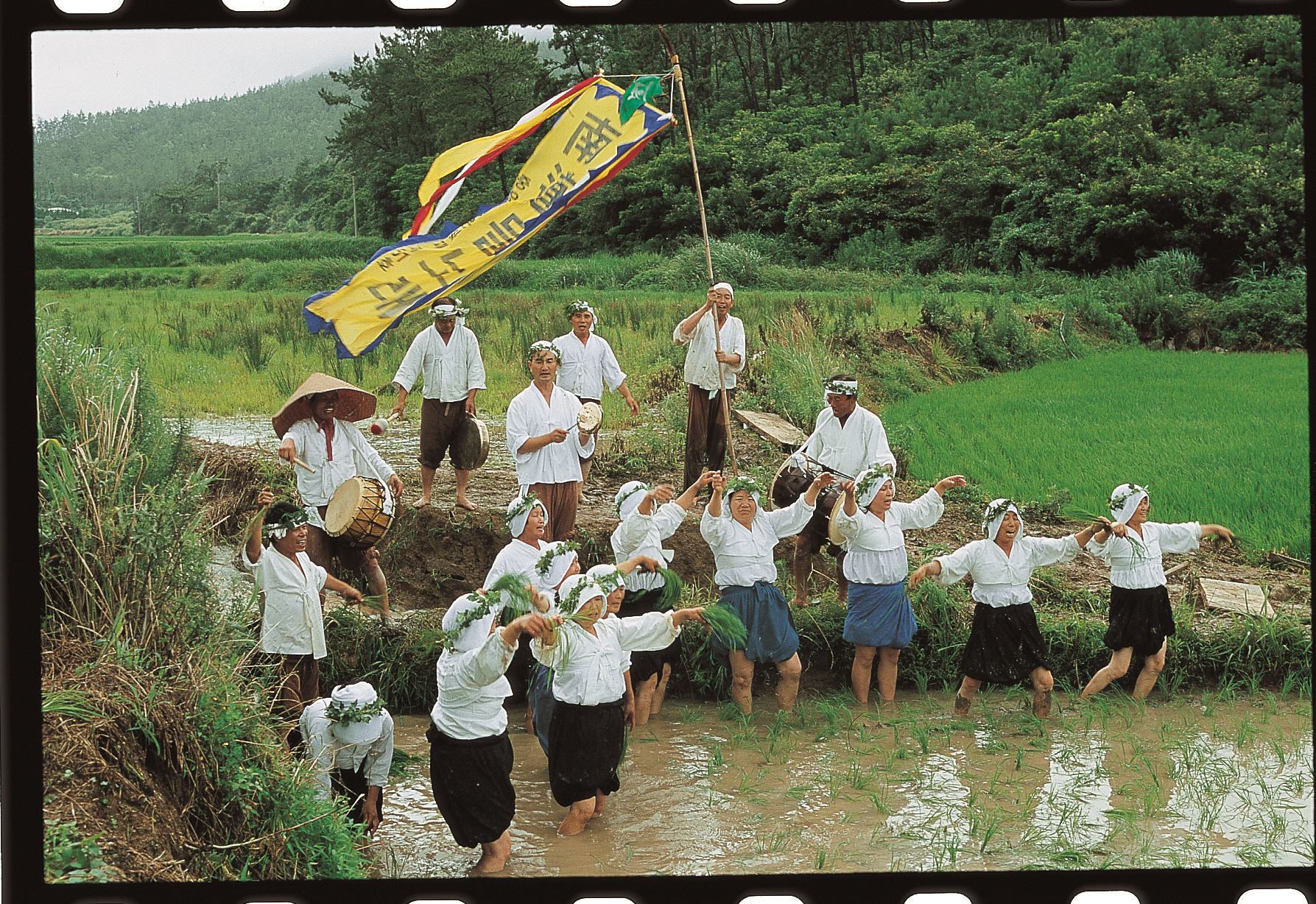
Jindo farmers singing traditional music (2004)

The tide-related sea level variations result in a land pass 2.9 km long and 10–40 meters wide opening for approximately an hour between the main Jindo island and the small Modo island to the south of Jindo. The event occurs about twice a year, around April–June. It had long been celebrated in a local festival called "Jindo's Sea Way", but was largely unknown to the world until 1975, when the French ambassador Pierre Randi described the phenomenon in a French newspaper. Nowadays, nearly half a million foreign and local tourists attend the event annually. It is accompanied by local festivals which include Ganggangsuwollae (Korean traditional circle dance), Ssitkim-gut (a shaman ritual, consoling the souls of the dead), Deul Norae (traditional farmers songs), Manga (burial ceremony songs), Jindo dog show, Buknori (drum performance) and fireworks.

The island has three art galleries, Sojun, Namjin and Sochi, containing collections of painters who worked here over the past centuries.

== See also ==
- List of islands of South Korea
- Geography of South Korea
