= Remco Breuker =

Dutch historian, author, academic

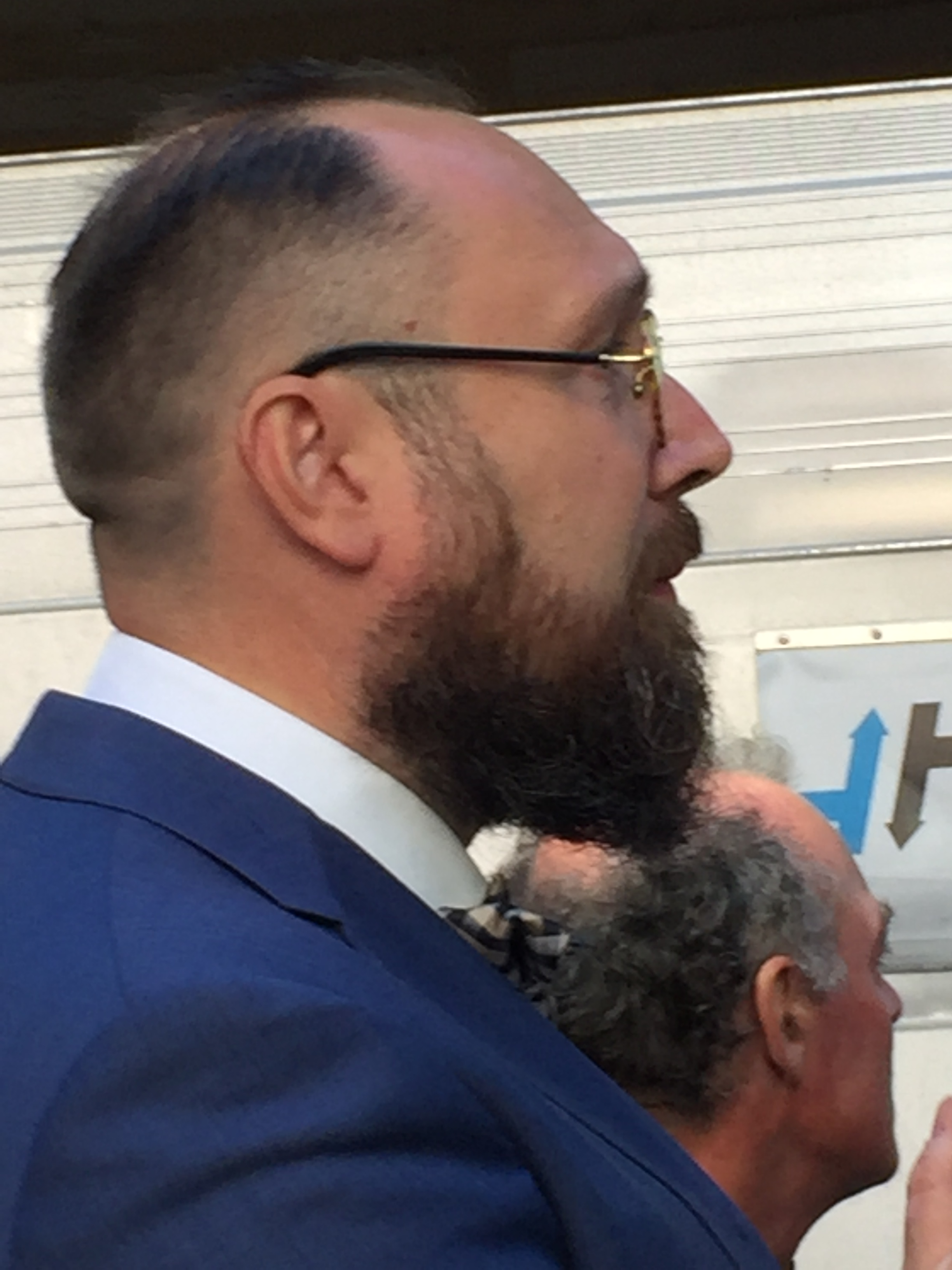
- Born: 1972 (age 53–54); Zaandam, The Netherlands
- Education: Leiden University (MA, PhD); Seoul National University

Remco Erik Breuker (born 1972) is a Dutch historian, author, academic, and translator specializing in Korea and Northeast Asia, focusing on medieval Korean and Northeast Asian history and contemporary North Korean affairs. He is currently a professor of Korean studies at Leiden University.

== Biography ==
In 2011, Breuker was promoted to full professor of Korean studies at Leiden University. Outside academia, Breuker works translating Korean literature into Dutch. He is also a regular media commentator on Korean affairs in the Netherlands.

== Education ==
Breuker possesses master's degrees in Japanese studies and Korean studies, and a doctorate in Korean history from Leiden University.

== Selected bibliography ==
- Remco Breuker. (2023). De Koreaanse golf [The Korean Gulf]. Amsterdam: Prometheus.
- Remco Breuker. (2018). De B.V. Noord-Korea: Een kernmacht in de marge. [North Korea, Inc.: A nuclear power in the margins]. Amsterdam: Prometheus.

Translated works

- Jang Jin-sung. (2014). Over de grens: Mijn ontsnapping uit Noord-Korea [Over the border: My escape from North Korea]. Amsterdam: De Arbeiderspers.
