= Hong Pok-wŏn =

Korean commander (1206–1258)

Korean name
- Hangul: 홍복원
- Hanja: 洪福源
Transcriptions
- Revised Romanization: Hong Bokwon
- McCune–Reischauer: Hong Pogwŏn

Chinese name
- Traditional Chinese: 洪福源
Transcriptions
Standard Mandarin
- Hanyu Pinyin: Hóng Fúyuán

Hong Pok-wŏn (Korean: 홍복원; Hanja: 洪福源; 1206–1258) was a Goryeo commander who later served as an administrator of the Mongol Empire. Descended from a northwestern warlord family, Hong Pok-wŏn defected to the Mongols in 1231 and eventually settled around Liaoyang and Shenyang, where he was installed him as an administrator of Goryeo defectors.

Hong Pok-wŏn had seven sons and one daughter. One of his sons, Hong Ta-gu, served in the military of the Yuan dynasty.

== Early life ==
Hong Pok-wŏn was born to Hong Tae-sun (홍대순; 洪大純), a toryon (military commander) under the Chujingun system in the region of Inju. He had about 3,000 armed men under his command. Toryons were often referred to as t'oho (powerful familities) because they behaved like autonomous warlords.

Hong Pok-wŏn and his father first encountered the Mongols in 1218 when they invaded Goryeo in pursuit of Khitan rebel groups. There is no record of Hong Tae-sun taking orders from the Goryeo court to coordinate an attack on the Mongols. The t'ohos of Northwestern Goryeo were at odds with the central court due to their control over their trade activities with northern nomads.

== Mongol service ==
When the Mongols invaded Goryeo in 1231, Hong Pok-wŏn defected to their side with his subordinates numbering 1500 families. He was given the post of Koryo kunmin manho ("the commander of ten thousand families of Koryo warriors"). He persuaded 40 Goryeo fortresses to surrender to the Mongols. After the Mongols left, the Goryeo court gave him the title of rangjang of Sŏgyŏng, which indirectly acknowledged that they had no real control over him and sought to compromise with the warlord. Hong Pok-wŏn rebelled in Sŏgyŏng in 1233 and killed Chŏng Ŭi, the general assigned to Sŏgyŏng to defend elite interests. The rebellion was defeated and Hong Pok-wŏn escaped to Mongol territory. His father and brother, Hong Paek-su, were captured and taken to Kaesong.

After fleeing, he went to Shenyang where he begged the Mongols to allow him to stay, and they appointed him kwanryong kuibu koryo kunmin changgwan ("the Commander of Submitted Koryo Warriors"). He became the leader of Goryeo defectors. In 1234, he was ordered to attack Goryeo. In 1238, about 2,000 Goryeo men under Cho Hyon-seup and Lee Won-ja submitted to the Mongols and were placed under Hong's command. In 1250, Hong had a quarrel with Wang Chun, a Goryeo royal hostage sent to the Mongols who stayed in his house. In 1252, Hong assembled his men and received permission to attack Goryeo. The next year, Hong instigated an attack on Goryeo by claiming that the king of Goryeo had no intention of returning the capital to Kaesong. He demanded bribes from the Goryeo court. The court responded the next year with large amounts of silver, gold, and leather. In 1256, Hong took part in the invasion of Goryeo as a commander of Goryeo troops. In 1258 he was executed because of defamation by Wang Chun.

== Death ==
Prince Wang Chun of Goryeo married a Mongol princess and started gaining influence among the Mongol elite. He was part of the Goryeo-Mongol reconciliation process that Wonjong of Goryeo successfully utilized to overthrow the military's power, and thus threatened Hong Pok-wŏn's position as the primary military expert on Goryeo operations. The Mongols were also worried about Hong's rise in Shenyang and Liaoyang and hoped to use a divide and conquer strategy to balance Hong's influence. The Goryeosa provides an account of personal conflict involving Hong, Wang Chun, and his Mongol wife who used her influence to cause the execution of Hong. The History of Yuan merely remarks that Hong and Wang Chun struggled for power over the Goryeo warrior defectors and Hong died after losing the contest.

According to Goryeosa, one day, he was angry with Prince Wang Chun and said: "I've done you favors for a long time. How could you frame me like this? You're a dog biting its own master!". But Wang Chun's wife got to hear him and rebuked him furiously: "I'm from the imperial family and his imperial majesty declared that prince Wang Chun is from the royal family of Goryeo and married me off to him. So I've served him day and night without any doubt. If he's a dog, how could there be anyone dwelling at his place? I ought to tell his imperial majesty." Although Hong panicked and begged crying for his life, she accused him in Möngke Khan's presence and he was sent dozens of champions to 'kick him to death'.

After Hong Pok-wŏn's death, the Goryeo people of Liaoyang were left under the control of the Hong clan while Wang Chun was left in control of some 2,000 Goryeo families in Shenyang.

== Family ==
- Father: Hong Daesun (홍대순)
- Mother (name unknown)
  - Younger brother: Hong Paek-su (홍백수)
- Wife (name unknown)
  - 1st son: Hong Ta-gu (홍다구; 洪茶丘)
  - 2nd son: Hong Kun-sang (홍군상; 洪君祥)
  - Daughter: Lady Hong (부인 홍씨; 夫人 洪氏)

== In popular culture ==
- Portrayed by Lee Won-jae in the 2012 MBC TV series God of War.

== See also ==
- History of Korea
- List of Goryeo people
