= Cho Wi =

Goryeo civil official

- Hangul: 조위
- Hanja: 趙瑋
- RR: Jo Wi
- MR: Cho Wi

Courtesy name
- Hangul: 계보
- Hanja: 季寶
- RR: Gyebo
- MR: Kyebo

Posthumous name
- Hangul: 장경
- Hanja: 莊景
- RR: Janggyeong
- MR: Changgyŏng

Cho Wi (Korean: 조위; Hanja: 趙瑋; 1287 – December 1, 1348 (Note: In the Korean calendar (lunisolar), he died on the 11th day of the 11th Lunar month of the 4th year of Chungmok's reign (1348).)) was a Goryeo civil official.

== Biography ==
Cho Wi was the fifth and youngest son of his father, Cho In'gyu, of the Pyongyang Cho clan, and his wife, Lady Cho, the daughter of Cho Ollyŏ (조온려; 趙溫呂). Cho Wi was from Sangwŏn, which then was a part of P'yŏngyang-bu. Cho's courtesy name was Kyebo, and his posthumous name was Changgyŏng. Cho married Lady Na, the daughter of Na Yu (나유; 羅裕), and had a son with her named, Hŭngmun, better known as Cho Ilsin.

Via protected appointment due to the rank of his father, Cho Wi was given his first government office of a kwŏnmu (권무; 權務) at the Ch'anghŭigung (창희궁; 昌禧宮) at the age of nine by Korean age reckoning. On October 4, 1310, Cho was promoted to left assistant transmitter (좌부대언; 左副代言; chwabudaeŏn) by King Chungseon.

During succession dispute over the Goryeo throne between King Chungsuk and King of Shenyang Wang Ko, Cho was a suspected Wang Ko supporter, but was eventually cleared of being a supporter, unlike his older brothers Cho Yŏn (조연; 趙璉) and Cho Yŏnsu (조연수; 趙延壽) who actively supported Wang Ko. Cho Wi was thus able to keep his offices in the Goryeo bureaucracy. He would be later promoted to assistant chancellor (찬성사; 贊成事; ch'ansŏngsa). However, with the return of King Chunghye, Cho Wi was demoted for his criticism of government affairs. In 1347, he was enfeoffed as the Great Lord of P'yŏngyang (평양부원군; P'yŏngyang puwŏn'gun) during the reign of King Chungmok.

A year after his enfeoffment, Cho died on December 1, 1348.
