= Princess Gyeongan =

Princess of Goryeo (fl. 13th century)

Princess of Goryeo
- Reign: ?–?
- Successor: Princess Hamnyeong
- Monarch: Wang Jeong, King Wonjong
- Husband: Wang Suk (m. 1260); eight cousin
- Issue: Wang Hyeon
- House: House of Wang (by birth and marriage)
- Father: Wonjong of Goryeo
- Mother: Princess Gyeongchang

Princess Gyeongan (Korean: 경안궁주; Hanja: 慶安宮主) or formally called as Grand Princess Gyeongan (경안장공주; 慶安長公主) was a Goryeo Royal Princess as the older daughter of King Wonjong and Princess Gyeongchang.

== Biography ==
On the 27th day of the 10th month (lunar calendar) of the year 1260 AD, she received her royal title as Princess Gyeongan (경안궁주; 慶安宮主) alongside her father who held a feast for ministers in the court and then, she married Wang Suk, Count Jean (왕숙 제안백) and later honoured as "Duke Je'an" (제안공). During this time, there were four opening ceremonies and two ceremonies held in the palace while consumed about 1000 gold and silver for this, also 3000 grains (rice) with the fabrics' consumption was uncountable. The couple later had a son named Wang Hyeon who would marry Lady Heo and died in 1300.

After Crown Prince Wang Sim ascended the throne in 1277, her mother and second older brother were accused of plotting treason and were exiled. Meanwhile, after her death, Suk remarried again with King Chungnyeol's daughter, Consort Jeongnyeong and went to the Yuan Dynasty several times under the name of the reign King, which made him become Grand Prince (대군), Great Prince (부원대군), also Three Grand Masters (삼중대광), then died at age 75 in 1312 (the 4th year of the reign of King Chungseon).
