= Princess Jeongshi =

Princess Jeongsin

Crown Princess of Goryeo
- Tenure: 2 August 1260 – 18 June 1274
- Coronation: 2 August 1260
- Predecessor: Crown Princess Yu
- Successor: Crown Princess Wang

Royal consort of Goryeo
- Tenure: 1274–1308
- Coronation: 1274

Dowager consort of Goryeo
- Tenure: 1308–1319
- Coronation: 1308
- Born: 1236; Goryeo
- Died: 4 May 1319 (aged 83); Goryeo
- Burial: November 1319
- Spouse: Chungnyeol of Goryeo (m. 1260; died 1308)
- Issue: Duke Gangyang; Princess Jeongnyeong; Princess Myeongsun
Regnal name
- Princess Jeonghwa (정화궁주; 貞和宮主; June 1274 – April 1319); Primary Consort Jeonghwa (정화원비; 貞和院妃)
- House: House of Wang (by birth and marriage)
- Father: Wang In, Duke Sian
- Mother: Lady Park
- Religion: Buddhism

Princess Jeongsin of the Gaeseong Wang clan (Korean: 정신부주 왕씨; Hanja: 貞信府主 王氏; 1236 – 4 May 1319 (Note: In the Korean calendar (lunisolar), she died on 14th day of the 4th month of 1319.)), firstly called as Princess Jeonghwa (정화궁주; 貞和宮主) or also known as Primary Consort Jeonghwa (정화원비; 貞和院妃), was a Goryeo royal family member as the granddaughter of Duke Yangyang who became the first wife of her third cousin once removed, King Chungnyeol and also the aunt of King Chungseon's 3rd wife.

== Biography ==
=== Early life and background ===
The future Princess Jeonghwa was born in 1236 as part of the Gaeseong Wang royal family as the daughter of Wang In, Duke Sian who was the grandson of King Sinjong through his second son, Duke Yangyang. She had two brothers; one of which would become the father of Chungseon's consort.

=== Marriage and palace life ===
In 1260, during the first year reign of King Wonjong of Goryeo, she married Crown Prince Wang Sim and became his princess consort (태자비; 太子妃). In 1274, Wang Sim married Kublai Khan's daughter, Qutugh Kelmysh as his new queen consort, which meant Lady Wang couldn't become the queen even though she was his principal wife when he was crown prince. She was then demoted into a lower rank, but was still honoured as Princess Jeonghwa (정화궁주; 貞和宮主) and lived in the "Jeonghwa Palace" (정화궁; 貞和宮).

She was said to have had a bad relationship with Qutugh Kelmysh and was hated so much by the latter that she was forced to live in a separate palace so she couldn't come close to the king. In 1275, a banquet was held to celebrate the birth of the new queen's first son. When Chungnyeol gave an order to place Princess Jeonghwa and Qutugh Kelmysh in the same position, Qutugh Kelmysh became very angry, believing that she was being treated as an equal of his first wife. She then suddenly moved Jeonghwa's seat. After a while, Princess Jeonghwa knelt down and offered a glass of wine to her, but the King turned around and blinked and the banquet ended immediately.

A year later in 1276 (2nd year reign of King Chungnyeol), a maid said that Princess Jeonghwa had a shaman curse Qutugh Kelmysh and 43 people, including Duke Jean, planning to do something unpleasant and trying to enter Ganghwa-do. Princess Jeonghwa was then imprisoned in Najang (나장; 螺匠), but with the help of official Yu-Gyeong (유경; 柳璥), she was able to defend herself and be released along with the others who were involved.

In 1284, there was an incident where Jeonghwa misunderstood the common people and made them servants, which made them file a lawsuit, called Apryangsageon (압량사건; 壓良事件) since the judgment was made in favor of her under King Chungnyeol's order. However, the presiding judge Gim Seo (김서) of this case, died suddenly after appearing on the scene the day after the verdict and only Yi Haeng-geom (이행검) who was aware of the injustice of the case, survived.

Princess Jeonghwa was believed to be devout in Buddhism and often prayed in Jeondeung Temple (전등사; 傳燈寺). There is also a record that she asked a Buddhist monk In Gi (인기; 印奇) to print the Tripitaka Koreana and kept it in Jeondeung temple. When she was the primary wife (원비; 院妃) in the past, she was also known as Primary Consort Jeonghwa (정화원비; 貞和院妃).

=== Later life and death ===
After Princess Jeguk's death, King Chungnyeol abdicated the throne to his legitimate son in 1298, Princess Jeonghwa's title was changed into Princess Jeongsin (정신부주; 貞信府主) alongside Chungnyeol who was able to came back to the palace. After this, she and the retired king lived together in Sangsu Palace (상수궁; 上壽宮) and King Chungseon also held a ceremony for them. She then died on 4 May 1319 and was buried in the same year.

She bore Chungnyeol a son and 2 daughters. Although her only son, Duke Gangyang was the oldest son of the king, he couldn't ascend the throne since his younger half brother, Chungseon of Goryeo was the legitimate son. Meanwhile, Gangyang's second son, Wang Go, was favoured by Chungseon so her brother, Marquess Seowon's daughter became one of Chungseon's consorts.

== Others ==
- Based on records left in Jeondeung Temple at 37–41, Jeondeungsa-ro, Gilsang-myeon, Ganghwa County, Incheon, it firstly founded during the Goguryeo periods with the name of "Jinjong Temple" (진종사; 眞宗寺) and changed into Jeondeung from the fact that Princess Jeonghwa delivered many jade lanterns to this temple as it was also her temple where she prays in.
- In Yi Saek's poem that written in Jeondeung Temple in Daeju-ro, sometimes her name is appeared in there.

== Family ==
- Father - Wang In, Duke Sian (시안공 왕인; 1195–1275)
  - Grandfather - Wang Seo, Duke Yangyang (양양공 왕서; 1170–?)
  - Grandmother - Lady Yi (이씨; 李氏; 1172–?)
- Mother - Lady Park (박씨, 朴氏; 1196–?)
- Sibling(s)
  - Older brother - Wang Jeong, Duke Susa (수사공 왕정; 1228–?)
  - Older brother - Wang Yeong, Marquess Seowon, Duke Yeongheon of Korea (서원후 한국영헌공 왕영; 1230–1291)
    - Niece - Royal Consort Jeong of the Kaeseong Wang clan (왕정비; 1275–1345)
- Spouse
  - Wang Geo, King Chungseon of Goryeo (고려 충렬왕; 3 April 1236 – 20 July 1308)
- Issue
  - Daughter - Royal Consort Jeongnyeong (정녕원비; 1250–?); Wang Suk's second wife
    - Son-in-law - Wang Suk, Duke Jean (제안공 왕숙)
  - Daughter - Royal Consort Myeongsun (명순원비; 1255–?)
    - Son-in-law - Wang Hyeon, Duke Hanyang (한양공 왕현; 1255–?)
  - Son - Wang Ja, Duke Gangyang (왕자, 王滋; 1270–1308)
    - Daughter-in-law - Lady Choi (최씨, 崔氏; 1270–?)

== In popular culture ==
- Portrayed by Kang Ye-sol in the 2017 MBC TV series The King in Love.
