= Princess Suheung =

- Princess of Goryeo
- Died: after 1277; Goryeo
- Spouse: Wang Jeon; seventh cousin
- Issue: Wang Suk; Wang Jing
- House: House of Wang (by birth and marriage)
- Father: Gojong of Goryeo
- Mother: Queen Anhye

Korean name
- Hangul: 수흥궁주
- Hanja: 壽興宮主
- RR: Suheung gungju
- MR: Suhŭng kungju

Princess Suheung (died after 1277) was a Goryeo Royal Princess as the only daughter of King Gojong and the younger sister of King Wonjong and King Yeongjong. Through her mother, King Huijong was her maternal grandfather. She later married Wang Jeon (왕전) and had two sons, but he then died in 1256 and was honoured as Duke Sinyang (신양공). Although her death date was unknown, but according to Choe Se-yeon (최세연)'s records, she was presumed to died after her grandnephew, Wang Jang appointed as the Crown Prince in 1277.
