= Princess Gyeongchang =

Korean royal consort (fl. 13th century)

Princess Gyeongchang 경창궁주

Crown Princess of Goryeo
- Tenure: 1244–1260
- Coronation: 1244
- Predecessor: Crown Princess Gim
- Successor: Crown Princess Wang

Queen consort of Goryeo
- Tenure: 1260–1274
- Coronation: 1260
- Predecessor: Queen Anhye
- Successor: Queen Jangmok
- Died: after 1277; Goryeo
- Spouse: Wonjong of Goryeo (m. 1244; died 1274)
- Issue: Marquess Siyang; Marquess Sunan; Princess Gyeongan; Princess Hamnyeong
- House: House of Wang (by birth); Yu clan (by marriage)
- Father: Wang Jeon, Duke Sinan
- Mother: Princess Gasun

Princess Gyeongchang of the Yu clan (Korean: 경창궁주 유씨; Hanja: 慶昌宮主 柳氏) was a Goryeo royal family member as the maternal granddaughter of King Huijong who became a queen consort through her marriage with her seventh cousin once removed, King Wonjong as his second wife and followed her maternal clan as a result.

In 1244 (31st year reign of Gojong of Goryeo), she was chosen as her maternal first cousin, Crown Prince Wang Jeong's second princess consort and then became his queen in 1260 alongside his eldest son, Wang Sim who formally became the Crown Prince. In 1263, her second son was given title as a "Marquess" and not long after that changed into "Duke". In 1271, Wang Sim married Kublai Khan's daughter, Qutugh Kelmysh and they were came back to Goryeo after Wonjong's death three years later.

In 1277, Duke Sunan was ill and weak, then she sent a Monk to pray for his health, which they later deposed and reduced to commoner status by the new king after being accused of plotting to install her own son on the throne. At this time, many said:

"Princess Gyeongchang and her son, Wang Jong cursed the King and prayed for her son to married the Princess, then become a King."
"경창궁주가 아들 왕종과 더불어 임금을 저주하며, 왕종으로 하여금 공주에게 장가들고 왕이 되도록 기도하였다".

Kim Pang-gyŏng (김방경; 金方慶), Hŏ Kong (허공; 許珙) and Cho In-gyu to question Gyeongchang and Sunan, but the King personally summoned Sunan for questioning, then exiled him, confiscated their houses and property, also their servants.
