= Grand Prince Danyang =

Goryeo prince (fl. 14th century)

- Born: Wang Hu; Goryeo
- Issue: Prince Yangwon
Regnal name
- Grand Prince Danyang (단양부원대군, 丹陽府院大君; given in 1310 by King Chungseon)
- House: Wang
- Father: Wang Cha, Duke Gangyang
- Religion: Buddhism

Korean name
- Hangul: 왕후
- Hanja: 王珛
- RR: Wang Hu
- MR: Wang Hu

Royal title
- Hangul: 단양대군
- Hanja: 丹陽大君
- RR: Danyang daegun
- MR: Tanyang taegun

Grand Prince Danyang (Korean: 단양대군; Hanja: 丹陽大君; fl. 14th century), born Wang Hu, was a Goryeo royal family member as the second son of Duke Gangyang and grandson of King Chungnyeol. He was promoted repeatedly and later reached the position of a Threefold Great Rectifer (삼중대광; 三重大匡; samjungdaegwang). Though his niece, he would eventually become the maternal granduncle of King Gongyang.

== Life ==
In 1320, Wang Hu went to Yuan dynasty and appointed as a congratulatory envoy (등극사; 登極使; tŭnggŭksa) for the new Yuan emperor Yingzong and sent to Daidu. In the following year, he went to Yuan again for celebrate the proclaim of a new era name and their Empress Dowager's coronation.

In 1333, when King Chungsuk, his older half first cousin, stayed in Yuan, Wang Hu became Kwŏnsŏhaengsŏngsa (권서행성사; 權署行省事) while temporarily take charge of its affairs. After Chungsuk went to Eoyong Hall (어용전; 御容殿) in Pyongyang, he then brought the National Seal (국인; 國印) along with assistant chancellor (찬성사; 贊成事; ch'ansŏngsa) Cho Chŏk (조적; 曺頔) and royal secretary (밀직사; 密直使; milchiksa) Chŏng Ki (정기; 鄭頎) for the King.

His grandmother, Princess Jeonghwa's older brother was a monk at Donghwa Temple (동화사; 桐華寺), made several thousand and hundred men as slaves, which Wang Hu benefited a lot. However, when civilians (양인; 良人) returned as a slaves (노비; 奴婢), Hu tried to inform the Yuan dynasty with cross the Yalu River, but failed after captured by the shackles sent by the Goryeo prime ministers, then returned to Gaegyeong.

In 1352, when Cho Il-sin's rebellion broke out, he invited King Gongmin to his house for a while. One year later, while Gongmin went to Chimwon (침원, 寢園; royal tomb) for did the Chunhyang (춘향, 春享; Ritual in Spring), Wang Hu attended as Aheongwan (아헌관).

In 1361, when the northwest was devastated by the invasion of the Red Turbans and Gaeseong was captured, Wang Hu surrendered along with Jeollipanseo Yi An (전리판서 이안; 典理判書 印安), General Kim Sŏ-gwang (대호군 김서광; 大護軍 金瑞光). Then, he gave them important military bases, where the land was fertile, where they could live and where there was grain in Gi County (기현; 畿縣). As a result, after the Red Turbans retreated, he and others were impeached by the inspectorate, their land and slaves were confiscated, also his descendants were also sentenced to imprisonment in 1362.
