= Duke Kangyang =

Prince of Goryeo (d. 1308)

- Prince of Goryeo
- Born: Wang Cha; Goryeo
- Died: 1308; Goryeo
- Issue: Wang Hu; Wang Ko; Wang Hun
- House: Wang
- Father: Chungnyeol of Goryeo
- Mother: Princess Jeongsin

Korean name
- Hangul: 왕자
- Hanja: 王滋
- RR: Wang Ja
- MR: Wang Cha

Royal title
- Hangul: 강양군, 강양공
- Hanja: 江陽君, 江陽公
- RR: Gangyanggun, Gangyanggong
- MR: Kangyanggun, Kangyanggong

Posthumous name
- Hangul: 정강
- Hanja: 靖康
- RR: Jeonggang
- MR: Chŏnggang

Duke Kangyang or Prince Kangyang (Korean: 강양공; Hanja: 江陽公; died 1308 (Note: In the Korean calendar (lunisolar), he died on 12th day of the 4th month of 1308.)), born Wang Cha, was a Goryeo royal prince as the first and oldest son of King Chungnyeol and Princess Jeongsin, also great-grandfather of its last monarch, King Gongyang.

== Biography ==
=== Palace life ===
As the oldest son and since his mother was King Chungnyeol's first wife, Wang Cha was the one who should become the crown prince. Yet, due to Yuan dynasty influence on Goryeo after the king's marriage with Kublai Khan's daughter–Qutugh Kelmysh, Wang Cha must give up the crown prince position to his half younger brother.

In 1279 (5th years reign of his father), Wang Cha had to go to the temple Dongsimsa (동심사) in Aju, Chungcheong Province (now Asan, South Chungcheong Province) to avoid conflict with the crown prince. Four years later in 1283, Wang Cha was able to back to Gaegyeong and received his royal title–Duke Kangyang (강양공; 江陽公).

=== Death and afterlife ===
Duke Kangyang died in 1308 (24th years reign of his father) and received his posthumous name, Chŏnggang (정강; 靖康) along with his honorary title, Duke Chŏnggang (정강공; 靖康公) given by his great-grandson–King Gongyang in 1391.

Although his wife is unknown, according to the remaining historical sources, Duke Kangyang had 3 sons: Wang Hu the Grand Prince Danyang (단양대군 왕후) who served in Yuan dynasty, Wang Ko the Prince Yeonan (연안군 왕고) who was King Chungseon's trusted official, and Wang Hun the Prince Yeondeok (연덕군 왕훈) who would become the grandfather of King Gongyang.
