= Princess Gyeguk =

Yuan Korean consort (c. 1285–1316)

Princess Supreme of Gye State 계국대장공주 薊國大長公主 Жи Гуо Да Жан гүнж

Queen consort of Goryeo (1st)
- Tenure: 1298–1298
- Coronation: 1298
- Predecessor: Queen Jangmok
- Successor: Queen Jangmok

Queen consort of Goryeo (2nd)
- Tenure: 1308–1313
- Coronation: 1308
- Predecessor: Queen Jangmok
- Successor: Queen Gongwon

Retired consort of Goryeo
- Monarch: King Chungsuk
- Born: Borjigin Budashiri c.1285 Yuan dynasty
- Died: 15 January 1316; Goryeo
- Burial: Goryeo
- Spouse: Chungseon of Goryeo (m. 1296)
Names
- Mongolian name: Borjigin Budashiri (Боржигин Будашир); Sino-Korean name: Pae'ajigŭn Botapsillyŏn (패아지근 보탑실련; 孛兒支斤 寶塔實憐)
Posthumous name
- Princess of the Han State (한국공주, 韓國公主); Grand Princess of the Han State (한국장공주, 韓國長公主)
- House: Borjigin (by birth); House of Wang (by marriage)
- Father: Gammala
- Mother: Buyan Kelmysh Khatun

- Princess Gyeguk
- Hangul: 계국대장공주
- Hanja: 薊國大長公主
- RR: Gyeguk daejang gongju
- MR: Kyeguk taejang kongju

Personal name
- Hangul: 보탑실련
- Hanja: 寶塔實憐
- RR: Botap sillyeon
- MR: Pot'ap sillyŏn

Princess Supreme Gyeguk (Korean: 계국대장공주; Hanja: 薊國大長公主; c.1285 – 15 January 1316; lit. 'Princess-Aunt of the State of Gye'), also known as Princess of Han State (한국공주; 韓國公主) and Grand Princess of Han State (한국장공주; 韓國長公主) was a Yuan Dynasty Imperial family member as the great-granddaughter of Kublai Khan and became a Korean queen consort though her marriage with Chungseon of Goryeo. She was the second Mongol ethnic queen consort from Yuan dynasty to Goryeo after her mother-in-law, Princess Jeguk.

Her personal name was Budashiri (Botashirin), transcribed as 寶塔實憐, pronounced in Korean as Botapsillin. It is from the Sanskrit Buddha-śrī. Those ladies who qualified as "princesses supremes" (daejang gongju, 大長公主) were aunts of an emperor. She was the aunt of two emperors: Buyantu Khan and Külüg Khan.

== Biography ==
=== Early life and relative ===
The future Princess Gyeguk was born in Yuan dynasty as the daughter of Gammala (son of Zhenjin and Kökejin Khatun) and Buyan Kelmish Khatun with the name of Budashiri. She had:

- Sünshan (brother)
- Yesun Temür (brother)
- Delgerbukha (brother)
- Radnabala (sister)
- Shouning – (sister; mother of Babusha Khatun and Sadabala Khatun)

=== Marriage and later life ===
In 1296, she married Crown Prince Wang Won and became his Primary Consort, then stayed in Sunggyeong Mansion (숭경부; 崇敬府), Junghwa Palace (중화궁; 中和宮) while went to Goryeo in the following year and became a Queen consort following her husband's first ascension to the throne. Like her mother-in-law who was initially her grandaunt, Budashiri also had her own attendant when came to Goryeo.

However, she and her husband were said to have had a bad relationship from the time they were newlywed and when he favoured a Goryeo woman he met before he married her, she was jealous and reported it to Yuan. As the result, the King was forced to abdicate to his father and his favoured one, Lady Jo with her families were taken and detained in Yuan. By this, many historians believed that she raised her own influence which she can easily get the supports from her homeland and families, also contributed to her active personality. Due to this, they didn't have any issue.

Her father-in-law, Chungnyeol of Goryeo tried to drive her away three times, but all failed.

It was said that she had a close political relationship with Wang Go, which he later married her niece in 1316 and since both Wang Won and Wang Go were married with Yuan's princess, so they fought for the Goryeo's throne. After her husband won through the support from Külüg Khan, she received her new title as Grand Princess of the Han State (한국장공주; 韓國長公主) and returned to Goryeo again with him. However, there were only 50 carts followed them whom splendor outside but very miserable inside.

After left alone by Chungseon, she started live by visit some Buddhist Temple or attend her stepson, King Chungsuk's banquet prepared by the government, then came back to Yuan not long after that. She caused a lot of political trouble and then died in Yuan in 1315, which her death was problematic. Her body then transferred and buried in Goryeo. In 1343, she was given the Imperial name of Princess Supreme of the Gye State (계국대장공주; 薊國大長公主) by her homeland.

== See also ==
- Goryeo under Mongol rule
