= Royal Consort Jeongbi Wang =

Goryeo crown princess (fl. 14th century)

Jeong-bi Wang 정비 왕씨

Crown Princess of Goryeo
- Tenure: 1289–?
- Predecessor: Crown Princess Wang
- Successor: Crown Princess Yi

Royal consort of Goryeo
- Tenure: ?–1325
- Predecessor: Royal Consort Ui
- Successor: Royal Consort Jo
- Born: 1275; Goryeo
- Died: 1345 (aged 69–70); Goryeo
- Spouse: Chungseon of Goryeo (m. 1289; died 1325)
- House: House of Wang (by birth and marriage)
- Father: Wang Yeong, Marquess Seowon
- Mother: Consort Sunan of Byeonhan State of the Hwangbo clan

Royal Consort Jeong of the Kaeseong Wang clan (Korean: 정비 개성 왕씨; Hanja: 靜妃 開城 王氏; 1275–1345) was a Korean royal family member as the great-granddaughter of Duke Yangyang, while Princess Jeonghwa was her aunt. She also became a Korean royal consort as the 3rd wife of her fourth cousin once removed, King Chungseon of Goryeo.

In 1287, she was originally chosen as a tribute girl (공녀; 貢女) for the Yuan dynasty, but two years later, Wang Won performed the custom and she was appointed as his princess consort and received the title of Consort Jeong (정비; 靜妃). In 1308, King Chungseon banned the same-clan marriage in his reinstatement letter and selected 15 families that could marry with the royal family. Meanwhile, she later died in 1345 (1st year reign of King Chungmok of Goryeo), but there were no records left about her tomb.

== Family ==
- Father - Wang Yeong, Marquess Seowon, Duke Yeongheon of Korea (서원후 한국영헌공 왕영; 1230–1291)
  - Grandfather - Wang In, Duke Sian (시안공 왕인; 1195–1275)
  - Grandmother - Lady Park (박씨, 朴氏; 1196–?)
  - Aunt - Princess Jeongsin of the Gaeseong Wang clan (정신부주 왕씨; 1236 – 4 May 1316)
- Mother - Grand Lady of Byeon State, Consort Suan of the Hwangbo clan (변한국순안비 황보씨; 1232–?)
  - Grandfather - Lord Hwangbo (황보씨; 1206–?)
- Sibling(s)
  - Older brother - Wang Bun, Marquess Ikyang (익양후 왕분; 1263–?)
    - Sister-in-law - Grand Lady of Jin State, Consort Janggyeong of the Miryang Park clan (진한국장경비 밀양 박씨; 1265–?)
  - Older brother - Wang Jeon, Marquess Seoheung (서흥후 왕전; 1270–1307)
- Spouse - Wang Won, King Chungseon of Goryeo (고려 충선왕; 20 October 1275 – 23 June 1325) — No Issue.

== In popular culture ==
- Portrayed by Park Hwan-hee in the 2017 MBC TV series The King in Love.
