= Marquess of Sunan =

Prince of Goryeo (fl. 13th century)

Marquess Sunan
- Prince of Goryeo
- Born: Wang Jong; Goryeo
- Died: after 1295; Goryeo
- House: House of Wang
- Father: Wonjong of Goryeo
- Mother: Princess Gyeongchang

Korean name
- Hangul: 왕종
- Hanja: 王悰/王琮
- RR: Wang Jong
- MR: Wang Chong

Royal title
- Hangul: 순안후, 순안공
- Hanja: 順安侯, 順安公
- RR: Sunanhu, Sunangong
- MR: Sunanhu, Sunan'gong

Marquess Sunan, or more commonly known as Duke Sunan, personal name Wang Jong was a Goryeo Royal Prince as the younger son of King Wonjong and Princess Gyeongchang.

== Biography ==
In 1263, alongside his older brother, he received his Royal Title of Prince Sunan (순안군개국후; 順安郡開國侯). As the beloved son, from 1269, he temporarily took over the affairs of the court on behalf of his father, who went to Mongolia and in 1273, he visited the Yuan dynasty as an envoy. At this time, the Yuan's Emperor favored and liked him, then gave him 500 geun (근) and 800 pil Jeo-pho (필) (저포; 苧布). It was believed that those items given to him were much more than those given to the Crown Prince Wang Sim, his half brother. After this, he then honoured as Duke of Sunan (순안공; 順安公).

In 1277, after Wonjong's death, Wang Sim ascended the throne, but there was one report related to the new King, said:

"Princess Gyeongchang and her son, Duke Sunan, orders Jong-Dong, a blind monk to curse His Majesty (King Chungnyeol) and Wang Jong had to married the Princess (Princess Supreme of Je State).
"경창궁주가 자신의 아들 순안공과 함께 맹인 승려인 종동(終同)을 시켜 주상(충렬왕)을 저주하고, 왕종으로 하여금 공주(제국대장공주)에게 장가들게 하려 한다."

He often made small meals and his mother asked Jong-Dong how to prevent evil held a ceremony and buried "Jeon-chan" (전찬; 奠饌) in the ground.

Knowing this, Chungnyeol immediately sent his people to study the monk's followers and in the following month, Kim Pang-gyŏng (김방경; 金方慶), Hŏ Kong (허공; 許珙) and Cho In-gyu were sent to study Gyeongchang and Jong directly. Since the two didn't confess, the King then personally took control of Wang in the next day. A few days later, the ministers asked for Gyeongchang and Jong's forgiveness, but the King was still tried to end his half family's line by destroying them. These ministers then asked the Yuan dynasty and they said that it should be done after received instructions. As the Queen Consort and former Imperial Princess, Qutugh Kelmysh strongly insisted on the capture and the house should be seized strongly, so she had no choice and then destroyed Gyeongchang's family's house. Since this, Sunan, who had a lot of property and wealth, were all occupied by Qutugh own.

In addition, this incident's entire story was reported to the Yuan. Under their direction in 1277, Gyeongchang was deposed and reduced her to a commoner status. Following this, Sunan and Jong-Dong were exiled to Gueum Province (구음도; 仇音島). After 6 years there, Jong then summoned back to the capital city, Gaegyeong in 1283. Later in 1295, the King built wealth for his sake and set up a vassal (속관; 屬官) for it. Meanwhile, there was no records left about him after that.
