= Cho Ilsin =

Goryeo civil official (fl. 14th century)

- Hangul: 조일신
- Hanja: 趙日新
- RR: Jo Ilsin
- MR: Cho Ilsin

Childhood name
- Hangul: 흥문
- Hanja: 興門
- RR: Heungmun
- MR: Hŭngmun

Cho Ilsin (Korean: 조일신; Hanja: 趙日新; ? – November 12, 1352 (Note: In the Korean calendar (lunisolar), he died on the 5th day of the 10th Lunar month of the 1st year of Gongmin's reign (1352).)) was a Goryeo civil official. A close confidant of King Gongmin while the future king was a Yuan hostage in Dadu, Cho became an official of the Goryeo court after Gongmin's return to Goryeo and ascension to the Goryeo throne. His political rivalry with the influential pro-Yuan Ki family, the kin of Yuan Empress Ki culminated in the Cho Ilsin rebellion in 1352. Cho attempted to eliminate the Ki family but failed, and was executed by King Gongmin.

== Biography ==
Given the childhood name of Cho Hŭngmun, Cho was born into the Pyongyang Cho clan. He was the son of Cho Wi, and the grandson of Cho In-gyu. His mother was Lady Na of the Naju Na clan. Cho would later marry the daughter of Hong T'ak (홍탁; 鐸) and changed his name from Hŭngmun to Ilsin.

In 1340, Cho went to the Yuan dynasty and would end up serving the future King Gongmin, when he was a royal hostage in the Yuan court. In 1351, King Gongmin ascended to the Goryeo throne after returning to his native home. Cho Ilsin was given the position of Assistant Executive in Political Affairs (참리; 參理; ch'amri). When Cho also returned to Goryeo, he was promoted to assistant chancellor (찬성사; 成事; ch'ansŏngsa).

Cho asked King Gongmin to re-establish the Personnel Authority (정방; 政房; chŏngbang), which had been recently abolished, to appoint civil officials, with the king appointing officials based on Cho's recommendations. The king denied Cho's request. The following month, two censors from the Censorate brought charges against Cho Ilsin. Cho, who had an ally in the censor-in-chief of the Censorate, was able to suppress the charges and remove the two censors from office. Cho would also make enemies of the Ki family who were the relatives of the Yuan empress, Empress Ki.

On November 6, 1352, Cho Ilsin and his followers, which included Chŏng Ch'ŏngi (정천기; 鄭天起), Ch'oe Hwasang (최화상; 崔和尙), Chang Sŭngryang (장승량; 張升亮), and Ko Ch'ungjŏl (고충절; 高忠節), attempted to eliminate the members of the Ki family and their political allies, such as Empress Ki's brother Ki Ch'ŏl, Ki Ryun (기륜; 奇輪), Ki Wŏn (기원; 奇轅), Ko Yongbo (고용보; 高龍普) and Yi Susan (이수산; 李壽山). However, only Ki Wŏn was killed with the rest escaping. Cho and his forces then went to the king's royal villa in Sŏngiptong (성입동; 星入洞) and killed some of the king's guards. The next day, on November 7, using the king's royal seal, Cho appointed himself as the Chancellor of the Right (우정승; 右政丞), and his follower, Chŏng Ch'ŏngi as the Chancellor of the Left (좌정승; 左政丞). Cho ordered his men to find Ki Ch'ŏl and the rest of his family and allies. They managed to catch the mother of Ki Ch'ŏl and Empress Ki, as well as Ki Ch'ŏl's wife, but not Ki Ch'ŏl himself.

On November 8, Cho attempted to pass the blame onto some of his subordinates. Inviting Ch'oe Hwasang to his home, he slew Ch'oe with Ch'oe's own sword. He then advised King Gongmin to put down the rest of the "rebels", who were Cho's ex-followers. Eight to nine of Cho's former subordinates were captured and executed, including Chang Sŭngryang. Chancellor of Left Chŏng Ch'ŏngi was stripped of his position and imprisoned, and Chŏng's son was executed. On November 9, with the post of Chancellor of the Left vacant, Cho himself took the post as well as other posts in the ministry of war and the censorate. Cho was also titled as the "Meritorious Minister who Assists in Stabilizing the Realm" (찬화안사공신; 贊化安社功臣). Cho also rewarded his remaining followers with posts, such as Ko Ch'ungjŏl, who was appointed as a vice director of the Royal Secretariat (동지밀직사사; 同知密直司事; tongji miljiksasa). The following day, on November 10, Cho Ilsin allowed King Gongmin to stay at the residence of his royal kinsman, Grand Prince Danyang. The king summoned an advisor, Yi Inbok (이인복; 李仁復), and asked him how he should deal with Cho. Yi suggested the king eliminate Cho. On November 12, at the Branch Secretariat for Eastern Campaigns, the king executed Cho Ilsin and captured 28 of his associates.
