= Wang Hun =

Wang Hun may refer to:

- Wang Hun (general) (223–297), general serving the Cao Wei and Jin dynasties
- Sunjong of Goryeo (1047–1083), personal name Wang Hun, Goryeo king
- Grand Prince Yeondeok (died c. 1346), Goryeo royalty
