= Princess Hamnyeong =

Princess of Goryeo (fl. 13th century)

Princess of Goryeo
- Reign: ?–?
- Predecessor: Princess Gyeongan
- Monarch: Wang Jeong, King Wonjong
- Husband: Wang Hye; third cousin once removed
- House: House of Wang (by birth and marriage)
- Father: Wonjong of Goryeo
- Mother: Princess Gyeongchang

Princess Hamnyeong (Korean: 함녕궁주; Hanja: 咸寧宮主) was a Goryeo Royal Princess as the younger daughter of King Wonjong and Princess Gyeongchang who later married her third cousin once removed, Wang Hye the Duke Gwangpyeong (왕혜 광평공). In 1279, he got dispatched to Gyeongsang Province and supervised a battleship to be used to conquer the East alongside Tapnap (탑납) and Hapbaekna (합백나), envoys from Yuan dynasty. Then in 1285, Hye died and his properties were confiscated by King Chungnyeol.
