= Toghtua Bukha =

Toghtua Bukha may refer to:

- Personal name of Tayisung Khan (1416–1452)
- Wang Toghtua Bukha (died 1376), King of Shen
