= Marquess of Siyang =

Prince of Goryeo (fl. 13th century)

Marquess Siyang
- Prince of Goryeo
- Born: Wang Yi/Tae; Goryeo
- Died: 1266; Goryeo
- House: House of Wang
- Father: Wonjong of Goryeo
- Mother: Princess Gyeongchang

Korean name
- Hangul: 왕이 / 왕태
- Hanja: 王珆
- RR: Wang I / Wang Tae
- MR: Wang I / Wang T'ae

Royal title
- Hangul: 시양후
- Hanja: 始陽侯
- RR: Siyanghu
- MR: Siyanghu

Marquess Siyang (died 1266 (Note: In the Korean calendar (lunisolar), he died on 22nd day of the 1st month of 1266.)), personal name Wang Yi or Wang Tae was a Goryeo Royal Prince as the oldest child and son of King Wonjong and Princess Gyeongchang.

In 1260, while Wonjong wanted if Wang Sim became the Crown Prince, his second wife opposed this and insisted on made her eldest son, Wang Yi became the Crown Prince. Gim Jun (김준) who opposed Gyeongchang, still supported Sim which made Yi unable to become the Crown Prince. In 1263, alongside his younger brother, he received his Royal Title of Prince Siyang (상주국 시양군개국후; 上柱國 始陽郡開國侯), given 300 Sik-eup (식읍) and 100 Sik-sil (식실). After that, a wealth was built for him named "Siyang-bu" (시양부; 始陽府) which there were 1 Jeon-cheom (전첨; 典籤) and Nok-sa (녹사; 錄事). He then died 3 years later in 1266.
