= Wang Lang banhon jeon =

Korean novel

Wang Lang-banhonjeon (Korean: 왕랑반혼전; 王郞返魂傳 The Story of the Return of Wang Lang's Spirit to This World) is a Buddhist narrative found in documents of the Koryo dynasty that was fleshed out and completed in the mid-Joseon dynasty. The story is about a man named Wang Lang who is taken to the other world for something he did but then is brought back to life.

== Authorship ==
The novel is published in Gwonnyeomyorok (勸念要錄 An Essential Record of Advice on Buddhist Invocations) published by Hwaeomsa in 1637 (15th year in the reign of King Injo of the Joseon dynasty). The foreword includes the characters “Naamchan (懶庵撰),” meaning “compiled by Naam,” which led scholars to believe that the book was compiled by Naam Bou (懶庵 普雨, 1515-1565), a Buddhist monk from the mid-Joseon dynasty. However, a version of the novel appears in Bulseolamitagyeong (佛說阿彌陀經 Amitabha Buddha Sutra), published in 1304 (30th year in the reign of King Chungnyeol from the Koryo dynasty), citing Gungwonjip (窮原集, a book of unidentifiable nature) as a reference. Therefore, the story is assumed to be written before the time of King Chungnyeol of Koryo, and the author is unknown.

== Plot ==
Wang Lang's real name is Wang Sagwe, and he is a man from Gilju. One night, his wife Song who has been dead for 11 years appears to him, telling him that Yeomla (Yama) is will punish the two of them for criticizing a devout Buddhist named An Nosuk. She then advises him to hang a painting of Amitabha Buddha on the west wall, and sit on the east side of the house, and recite Buddhist invocations.

The next day, Wang Lang does as Song told him the night before when five demon messengers appear. They pay respects to the painting and bow to Wang, telling him that they admire Wang but that they were ordered by Yeomla to bring him to the other world. Although the third demon messenger argues that Wang Lang should be tied up and brought to Yeomla, the rest of the demon messengers disagree, saying that someone reciting the Buddhist invocations should not be tied up. The first demon messenger comforts Wang by telling him that his sin is grave enough for him to be sent to hell but their good word will bring him back to life.

In hell, the five demon messengers speak highly of Wang's conduct to Yeomla, who becomes impressed by Wang. He then calls choepangwan (an official in hell), telling him to look for ways for Wang's wife Song, who has died so long ago and no longer has a body, to be reincarnated. Choepangwan comes up with an idea of putting Song's soul in the body of the princess of Wolji who died at the age of 21 and was reborn in Yamacheon (the third of the six realms in the Buddhist cosmology). Advising Wang Lang and his wife not to criticize Ahn Nosuk, Yeomla asks them to relay to Ahn that he will pass away in three years. Wang Lang comes back to life, while Song is reborn as a princess of Wolji. Seeing that her daughter has come back to life, the king of Wolji is overjoyed at first but becomes morose when he hears about what happened in the other world. Song and Wang Lang live together for the rest of their lives until they die and go to heaven.

== Features and Significance ==
There have been conflicting arguments about Wangnangbanhonjeon being the first novel written in hangeul (Korean alphabet), which became irrelevant when an edition written in Chinese characters from the Koryo dynasty was eventually discovered. However, this story is published in both Chinese characters and in Korean in Gwonnyeomyorok, which shows how this Buddhist narrative came to be enjoyed in hangeul. This novel also illustrates the process in which a story about a man's experience in hell is developed into an early work of fiction in the Koryo dynasty. As the story involves the prolonging of the protagonist's life, it is related to the tales or dances and songs about prolonging life. In particular, it features a scene in which the protagonist fools the demon messengers, which is comparable to the plot of Jangjapuri, a seosamuga (a shaman's song and dance performance with a narrative).

== Other ==
The genre of the book is considered a Buddhist novel. However, there are conflicting thoughts on whether it should be considered a novel as it lacks the structure of fiction and is also bound together with annotations of Buddhist scriptures, while some also consider it a play for the conversational tone of the work.

== Texts ==
There is a total of 10 editions of Wangnangbanhonjeon. Among them, two editions are bound together with the Buddhist scripture Amitagyeong (Amitabha Sutra), one is bound with Gwonnyeomoyorok, and seven are published together with the Buddhist book Yeombulbogwonmun (A Book of Buddhist Invocations).
