= Grand Prince Yeondeok =

Goryeo prince (fl. 14th century)

- Born: Wang Hun; Goryeo
- Died: c.1346 Goryeo
- Spouse: Lady Cho, Consort Anui
- Issue: Princess Boknyeong
Regnal name
- Prince Yeondeok (연덕군; 延德君; given in 1310 by King Chungseon); Grand Prince Yeondeok (연덕부원대군; 延德府院大君; given in 1316 by King Chungsuk)
Posthumous name
- Yanghyo (양효, 良孝; "Kind-hearted and Filial")
- House: Wang
- Father: Wang Cha, Duke Gangyang
- Religion: Buddhism

Korean name
- Hangul: 왕훈
- Hanja: 王塤
- RR: Wang Hun
- MR: Wang Hun

Royal title
- Hangul: 연덕군, later 정원부원군
- Hanja: 延德君, later 定原府院君
- RR: Yeondeokgun, later Jeongwon buwongun
- MR: Yŏndŏkkun, later Chŏngwŏn puwŏn'gun

Posthumous name
- Hangul: 양효
- Hanja: 良孝
- RR: Yanghyo
- MR: Yanghyo

Grand Prince Yeondeok (born Wang Hun) or known before as Prince Yeondeok, was a Goryeo Royal family member as the 3rd and youngest son of Duke Gangyang, son of King Chungnyeol. Through his only daughter, he would become the maternal grandfather of King Gongyang. He was once imprisoned after committing adultery with Kim Yŏng-jang (김영장)'s widow, but was soon released after his brother exerted pressure on Goryeo court due to the power he had from Yuan.
