= Wang Jeon =

Wang Jeon may refer to:

- Wonjong of Goryeo (1219–1274), born Wang Jeon, ruler of Goryeo
- Gongmin of Goryeo (1330–1374), personal name Wang Jeon, ruler of Goryeo
