= Wang Ko =

Korean prince (fl. 14th century)

- Prince Yeonan (연안군, 延安君; lit. 'Lord of Yeonan')

Prince Shen(Sim) of Yang
- Reign: 1316–1345
- Coronation: 1316
- Predecessor: Wang Jang
- Successor: Wang Heun
- Died: 1345
- Wife: Princess Nullyun
- Issue: Wang Deoksu; Wang Toghtua Bukha
- House: Wang
- Father: Wang Ja, Duke Gangyang

Korean name
- Hangul: 왕고
- Hanja: 王暠
- RR: Wang Go
- MR: Wang Ko

Wang Ko (Korean: 왕고; Hanja: 王暠; Mongolian name: Öljeyitü (完澤禿); d. 1345), known by his Korean Royal title as Prince Yeonan (연안군; 延安君) and served in Yuan as King Shen of Yang (심양왕; 瀋王), was a Goryeo Royal Family member as the son of Duke Gangyang and grandson of King Chungnyeol who became a nobleman in Yuan Dynasty and a potential competitor to King Chungseon (his half uncle) and King Chungsuk which favored him.

== Biography ==
In 1314 when King Chungseon passed the throne to his son Ratnashri (King Chungsuk), Öljeyitü was installed as Crown Prince and sent to the Yuan court as a hostage by rule. However, when King Chungsuk fathered Buddhashri (King Chunghye), Öljeyitü forced to abdicate from crown prince, but King Chungseon transferred his post of King of Shen to him instead. The title of King of Shen was originally given to King Chungseon by Khayishan (Külüg Khan) after his support of Khayisan's succession in 1307. Öljeyitü married with a daughter of Sungshan (松山 songshan), King of Liang (粱王) of the imperial family.

When Sidibala (Gegeen Khan) ascended to the throne in 1320, Öljeyitü began a campaign to become the King of Goryeo. By his scheme, the Khan banished Chungseon to Tibet in 1320 and interned King Chungsuk in 1321. However, Sidibala was assassinated in 1323 and Öljeitü's plan was aborted.

King Chungsuk, who was allowed to return to Goryeo in 1325, passed the throne to Buddhashri in 1330 but was reinstated after two years because Buddhashri was deposed by Yuan. In 1333 Öljeyitü reached a settlement with Ratnashri and returned to Goryeo.

When King Chungsuk died in 1339, Öljeyitü try to wrest the crown again but was crushed by King Chunghye. However Bayan, who seized real power, hated Chunghye because he had friendly relations with El Temür, whose faction was purged by Bayan. Bayan imprisoned Chunghye in 1340. Immediately after that, Bayan was banished by his nephew and Öljeyitü's plot was stopped again.

King Chunghye was arrested in 1343 and died while being transported to Guangdong. Wang Ko acted as a king for a while. Padma Dorji (King Chungmok), Chunghye's little son, ascended to the throne after the death of Chunghye. Öljeyitü returned to Goryeo but died the next year.

In 1354 Öljeyitü's grandson Toghtua Bukha (脫脫不花) was installed as King of Shen. In 1356 Öljei Khutugh Khatun wanted him to become King of Goryeo but he refused the offer. When King Gongmin died in 1374, the Yuan Dynasty in Mongolia tried to appoint him again and a faction in Goryeo welcomed the plan, but it was eventually failed.

== Family ==
- Father: Duke Gangyang (d. 1308)
  - Grandfather: Chungnyeol of Goryeo (1236–1308)
  - Grandmother: Princess Jeonghwa
    - Older brother: Wang Hu, Prince Danyang
    - Younger brother: Wang Hun, Prince Yeondeok
- Wife: Princess Nullyun (눌륜공주, 訥倫公主; d. 1328) – daughter of Songshan, Prince of Liang and a niece of Princess Gyeguk.
  - 1st son: Wang Deok-su, Grand Prince Gangneung (왕덕수 강릉대군; 王德壽 江陵大君)
    - 1st grandson: Toktabuka, King of Sim (1310–1388)
    - 2nd grandson: Tegeubuka (테그부카; 帖古不花)
    - 3rd grandson: Witabulhwa (위타불화; 爲朶不花)
  - 2nd son: Taltalcheopbona (탈탈첩본아; 脫脫帖本兒)

== In popular culture ==
- Portrayed by Lee Jae-yong in the 2013–2014 MBC TV series Empress Ki.
