= Pyongyang Jo clan =

Korean clan from Pyongyang

Pyongyang Cho clan
- Country: Korea
- Current region: Pyongyang
- Founder: Cho Ch'un
- Website: www.pycho.org

The Pyongyang Cho clan (Korean: 평양 조씨; Hanja: 平壤趙氏) is a Korean clan, with the bon-gwan (ancestral seat) based in Pyongyang, North Korea.

== Background ==
The progenitor of the clan is considered to be Cho Ch'un (조춘; 趙椿), who lived during the reigns of King Yejong and Injong of Goryeo.

The clan rose to prominence due to Cho In-gyu (1237 – 1308), who rose from an interpreter to chancellor of Goryeo. His daughter, Royal Consort Cho, was married to Crown Prince Wang Wŏn (later King Chungseon). When King Chungseon began his second reign as king in 1308, the Pyongyang Cho clan was listed as one of the fifteen great ministerial families (재상지종; 宰相之種; chaesang chi chong) that were eligible for marriage with the royal House of Wang. The Pyongyang Cho clan would continue to hold influence in the late Goryeo and early Joseon eras. Cho In-gyu's grandson, Cho Il-sin, became a merit subject of King Gongmin. In 1352, he tried to eliminate the rival Ki clan but failed and was killed. Three members of the clan would become dynasty founding merit subjects during the establishment of the new Joseon dynasty: Cho Chun, Cho Pak, and Cho Kyŏn. Cho Chun, in particular, would initiate land reform with the Rank Land Law (과전법; 科田法; kwajŏn pŏp) and rise to the top post of Chief State Councilor.

The 2015 South Korean census recorded 50,480 individuals who were members of the Pyongyang Cho clan.

== Members ==
- Cho In-gyu (1237 – 1308), Goryeo civil official, chancellor
- Royal Consort Cho, consort of King Chungseon of Goryeo
- Cho Il-sin (died 1352), Goryeo rebel
- Cho Pak (1356 – 1408), Goryeo and Joseon civil official
- Cho Hŭiryong (1789 – 1866), Joseon painter
- Cho Tae-yong (born 1956), South Korean diplomat and politician

== See also ==
- Cho (Korean surname)
