= Royal Consort Sunbi Heo =

Goryeo consort (1271–1335)

Sun-bi Heo 순비 허씨
- Royal consort of Goryeo
- Born: 1271; Goryeo
- Died: 1335 (aged about 64/5); Goryeo
- Spouse: Duke Pyeongyang; Chungseon of Goryeo
- Issue: 3 sons and 4 daughters (with Duke Pyeongnyang)
- House: Yangcheon Heo clan (by birth); House of Kaesong Wang (by 1st and 2nd marriage)
- Father: Heo Gong, Duke Mungyeong
- Mother: Lady Choi (biological); Lady Yun (adoptive)
- Religion: Buddhism

Royal Consort Sun of the Yangcheon Heo clan (Korean: 순비 양천 허씨; Hanja: 順妃 陽川 許氏; 1271–1335) was the sixth wife of King Chungseon of Goryeo. She was firstly married to Duke Pyeongyang, son of Duke Jean and had 3 sons and 4 daughters.

After his death, she married King Chungseon. It was said that her relationship with the King's beloved wife, Lady Gim was not good since the two of them received the same gogo (고고; 姑姑), an official hat that was worn by the women of the Yuan imperial clan. Since Heo was the mother-in-law of the Emperor, she even went to Yuan's Imperial Palace to inquire about her son-in-law. During a banquet, Lady Heo and Lady Kim changed their attire five times to show off their luxurious clothes and appearance. all of her children married into noble families and the Yuan Imperial Family.

== Family ==
- Father: Heo Gong, Duke Mungyeong (허공 문경공; 1233–1291)
- Mother:
  - Biological: Lady Choi (부인 최씨)
  - Adoptive: Lady Yun, Princess Consort Yeongpyeong (영평군부인 윤씨)
- Husband(s):
  - First: Wang Hyeon, Duke Pyeongyang (왕현 평양공; d. September 1300)
    - Father-in-law: Wang Suk, Duke Jean (왕숙 제안공)
    - Mother-in-law: Princess Gyeongan (경안궁주)
      - First son: Wang Suk, Grand Prince Sunjeong (왕숙 순정대군)
      - Second son: Monk Jagak (자각; 慈覺)
      - Third son: Wang Jeong, Prince Hoein (왕정 회인군)
      - First daughter: Princess Yeongbok (영복옹주)
      - Second daughter: Princess Yeonhui (연희옹주)
      - Third daughter: Bayan Qutugh Khatun (백안홀독황후)
      - Fourth daughter: Princess Gyeongnyeong (경녕옹주)
  - Second: Chungseon of Goryeo (고려 충선; 20 October 1275 – 23 June 1325) – No issue.
