= The King in Love =

2017 South Korean television series

- Promotional poster
- Also known as: The King Is in Love
- Hangul: 왕은 사랑한다
- Lit.: The King Loves
- RR: Wangeun saranghanda
- MR: Wangŭn saranghanda
- Genre: Historical; Romance; Melodrama
- Based on: The King Loves by Kim Yi-ryung
- Developed by: Lim Hwa-min
- Written by: Song Ji-na; Park Chan-kyung; No Sun-jae
- Directed by: Kim Sang-hyeop
- Starring: Im Si-wan; Im Yoon-ah; Hong Jong-hyun
- Country of origin: South Korea
- Original language: Korean
- No. of episodes: 40

Production
- Executive producer: Cho Eun-young
- Producers: Jang Jae-hoon; Kim Sang-woo
- Camera setup: Single-camera
- Running time: 35 minutes
- Production company: U-Story9 (Note: Also referred to as U-Story 9 International)

Original release
- Network: MBC
- Release: July 17 – September 19, 2017

The King in Love (Korean: 왕은 사랑한다; lit. 'The King Loves') is a 2017 South Korean historical drama directed by Kim Sang-hyeop with screenplay by Song Ji-na, Park Chan-kyung and No Sun-jae, based on the novel of the same name by Kim Yi-ryung. It starred Im Si-wan, Im Yoon-ah and Hong Jong-hyun. The pre-produced drama aired on MBC from July 17 to September 19, 2017, on Mondays and Tuesdays at 22:00 (KST).

== Synopsis ==
Set in the Goryeo dynasty, it tells the story of a young and ambitious monarch named Wang Won (Im Si-wan) with a desire to conquer, and two people who shape his destiny; childhood friend Wang Rin (Hong Jong-hyun) and a beautiful young woman named Eun San (Im Yoon-ah). These three get to know each other and become the closest of friends but feelings of affection and love arise between these three. The young Crown Prince, falls in love with the young woman Eun San and would do anything to save her. He comes to love her more than himself. But on the other hand, his childhood friend Wang Rin also fell in love with Eun San at first sight. Even though he loves her so much, he still hid his affection for her because of his duty to his Crown Prince and because he doesn't want to hurt his best friend's feelings. But the time came when Eun San realizes her feelings for Rin and vice versa.

== Cast ==
=== Main ===
- Im Si-wan as Crown Prince Wang Won
  - Nam Da-reum as young Wang Won
  - Moon Woo-jin as child Wang Won
  - Song Min-jae as child Wang Won

The crown prince of Goryeo; Korea's first royalty of mixed heritage; grandson of Kublai Khan.

- Im Yoon-ah as Eun San, Princess Hyeonae / So-hwa
  - Lee Seo-yeon as young Eun-san

The strong-willed daughter of a wealthy nobleman, who possesses striking beauty and deadly charm. She hides her identity in order to survive. She started to return Wang Rin's feelings.

- Hong Jong-hyun as Wang Rin
  - Yoon Chan-young as young Wang Rin, Marquess Sujeong

Won's childhood friend; an elegant and refined man with an upright nature. He started to fall in love with Eun-san.

- Oh Min-suk as Song In

=== Supporting ===
==== Royal Family ====
- Jeong Bo-seok as King Chungnyeol, 25th king of Goryeo, Wang Won's father
- Jang Young-nam as Princess Wonseong (Qutlugh Kelmysh Beki), Kublai Khan's daughter; Chungnyeol's wife & Wang Won's mother
  - Kim Bo-ra as young Princess Wonseong
- Kim Byung-chun as Choi Se-yeon, Princess Wonseong's eunuch
- Kim Jae-woon as In-hu / Hulatai
- Min Young-won as Court Lady Jo, Princess Wonseong's court lady
- Baek Song-yi as Princess Wonseong's female bodyguard

==== Wang Won's side ====
- Kim Jeong-wook as Eunuch Kim, Wang Won's attending eunuch
- Bang Jae-ho as Jin-kwan, Wang Won's bodyguard
- Ki Do-hoon as Jang Ui, Wang Won's bodyguard

==== Wang Rin's side ====
- Kim Ho-jin as Wang Young, Marquess Seowon; Wang Rin's father
- Park Hwan-hee as Wang-Dan, Wang Rin's younger sister who has a crush on Wang Won
- Yoon Jong-hoon as Wang Jeon, Marquess Seoheung; Wang Rin's elder brother

==== Eun San's side ====
- Lee Ki-young as Eun Young-baek, Eun San's father
- Um Hyo-sup as Lee Seung-hyu, Eun San's teacher
- Park Ji-hyun as Bi-Yeon, Eun San's personal maid
  - Song Soo-hyun as young Bi-yeon
- Kim Jung-hak as Goo Hyung

==== Song In's side ====
- Choi Jong-hwan as Song Bang-young, Song In's cousin.
- Choo Soo-hyun as Shi Moo-bi / Ok Boo-yong, a doctor who is also Song In's girlfriend who spies the king after seducing him.
- Park Young-woon as Moo-suk, the man with the snake tattoo.

==== Others ====
- Ahn Se-ha as Gae-won
- Moon Won-joo as Senior guard Shik
- Kim Kyung-jin as Yum-bok
- Moon Jung-soo as Dol-bae
- Kang Ye-sol as Princess Jeonghwa, King Chungnyeol's first wife
- Kim Sung-jae as Duke Gangyang
- Yoon Yoo-sun as Lady Kim
- Cha-yeop as Byung-soo
- Kang-hee as Sung-jae
- Oh Ki-hwan as Kwan-gun
- Lee Dae-seung as Jang-in
- Kim-Young as Hak-ja
- Park Jong-hyun as General Im
- Ha-min as Ahn San-daek
- Park Won-ho as Chul-koo
- Seo Beom-sik
- Jeon Heon-tae
- Yeom Jae-wook
- Kim Hwa-yeon
- Lee Han-wi
- Yeom Jae-wook
- Jeong Ji-hoon
- Kim Ki-tak
- Park Hye-jin

== Production ==
- The series is one of a handful of youth sageuk set in production after the success of Love in the Moonlight (2016) starring Park Bo-gum and Kim Yoo-jung.
- Its first script reading took place on December 21, 2016 at MBC in Sangam, Seoul, South Korea. Filming commenced in late 2016 and concluded in June 2017. It is invested by Chinese company Tencent.

== Original soundtrack ==
The King in Love OST Album

Soundtrack album by Various artists
- Released: 2017
- Genre: Soundtrack
- Language: Korean
- Label: U-Story9, CJ E&M Music

=== Part 1 ===
Released on July 18, 2017
No.	Title	Lyrics	Music	Artist	Length
1.	"Starlight"	December 32nd	Taebong	Roy Kim	03:27
2.	"Starlight" (Inst.)		Taebong		03:27
Total length:					06:54

=== Part 2 ===
Released on July 25, 2017
No.	Title	Lyrics	Music	Artist	Length
1.	"But"	Sim Eun-ji; LEL	Sim Eun-ji; LEL	Lee Hae-ri (Davichi)	04:15
2.	"But" (Inst.)		Sim Eun-ji; LEL		04:15
Total length:					08:30

=== Part 3 ===
Released on August 1, 2017
No.	Title	Artist	Length
1.	"Do You Know"	Kim Yeon-ji	04:15
2.	"Do You Know" (Inst.)		04:15
Total length:			08:30

=== Part 4 ===
Released on August 8, 2017
No.	Title	Artist	Length
1.	"My Heart"	Im Si-wan	04:11
2.	"My Heart" (Inst.)		04:11
Total length:			08:22

=== Part 5 ===
Released on August 15, 2017
No.	Title	Artist	Length
1.	"Could You Tell Me"	Luna (f(x))	04:01
2.	"Could You Tell Me" (Inst.)		04:01
Total length:			08:02

=== Part 6 ===
Released on August 22, 2017
No.	Title	Artist	Length
1.	"Stay"	Jung Joon-young	04:14
2.	"Stay" (Inst.)		04:14
Total length:			08:28

=== Part 7 ===
Released on August 22, 2017
No.	Title	Artist	Length
1.	"Hidden Time"	SE O (세오)	03:51
2.	"Hidden Time" (Inst.)		03:51
Total length:			07:42

=== Part 8 ===
Released on September 5, 2017
No.	Title	Artist	Length
1.	"I Miss You"	Oliver	4:43
2.	"I Miss You" (Inst.)		4:43
Total length:			9:26

== Ratings ==
Ep.	Original broadcast date	Average audience share			
Ep.	Original broadcast date	Nielsen Korea		TNmS	
Ep.	Original broadcast date	Nationwide	Seoul	Nationwide	Seoul
1	July 17, 2017	7.8% (20th)	9.0% (10th)	8.0% (18th)	9.2% (16th)
2	July 17, 2017	8.1% (18th)	9.1% (9th)	8.6% (16th)	9.5% (10th)
3	July 18, 2017	5.1% (25th)	5.5% (NR)	6.0% (NR)	6.4% (NR)
4	July 18, 2017	6.0% (22nd)	6.3% (NR)	6.5% (20th)	6.8% (NR)
5	July 24, 2017	6.2% (26th)	6.9% (NR)	6.9% (NR)	7.6% (NR)
6	July 24, 2017	7.0% (22nd)	7.3% (18th)	7.0% (NR)	7.2% (NR)
7	July 25, 2017	7.0% (19th)	7.5% (13th)	6.9% (NR)	7.4% (19th)
8	July 25, 2017	7.2% (17th)	7.6% (12th)	7.6% (17th)	8.0% (16th)
9	July 31, 2017	5.9% (27th)	6.1% (NR)	6.5% (NR)	6.7% (NR)
10	July 31, 2017	6.8% (23rd)	7.3% (19th)	7.3% (18th)	7.8% (NR)
11	August 1, 2017	6.3% (20th)	6.1% (19th)	6.5% (20th)	6.7% (NR)
12	August 1, 2017	6.9% (17th)	7.1% (16th)	6.7% (19th)	6.9% (20th)
13	August 7, 2017	5.6% (26th)	5.7% (NR)	6.6% (NR)	6.7% (20th)
14	August 7, 2017	6.3% (24th)	6.9% (17th)	7.0% (19th)	7.6% (NR)
15	August 8, 2017	6.2% (20th)	6.4% (18th)	7.0% (18th)	7.2% (19th)
16	August 8, 2017	7.2% (15th)	7.5% (13th)	7.5% (17th)	7.8% (15th)
17	August 14, 2017	6.5% (23rd)	6.6% (15th)	7.0% (NR)	7.1% (13th)
18	August 14, 2017	6.6% (22nd)	6.7% (15th)	7.0% (19th)	7.2% (13th)
19	August 15, 2017	6.5% (26th)	7.3% (19th)	6.6% (NR)	7.4% (20th)
20	August 15, 2017	7.4% (17th)	7.5% (19th)	6.5% (NR)	6.6% (13th)
21	August 21, 2017	6.2% (24th)	6.8% (NR)	6.5% (19th)	7.1% (13th)
22	August 21, 2017	7.0% (21st)	7.4% (16th)	7.1% (17th)	7.5% (11th)
23	August 22, 2017	7.2% (16th)	7.1% (15th)	7.5% (18th)	7.6% (17th)
24	August 22, 2017	7.7% (12th)	7.6% (10th)	8.1% (17th)	8.2% (11th)
25	August 28, 2017	6.4% (22nd)	6.5% (20th)	6.4% (18th)	6.5% (15th)
26	August 28, 2017	6.4% (22nd)	6.6% (20th)	6.3% (17th)	6.4% (NR)
27	August 29, 2017	6.9% (18th)	6.9% (17th)	7.3% (18th)	7.0% (10th)
28	August 29, 2017	7.1% (15th)	7.2% (15th)	7.4% (15th)	6.9% (18th)
29	September 4, 2017	5.7% (25th)	6.4% (20th)	6.3% (18th)	7.0% (14th)
30	September 4, 2017	6.0% (24th)	6.7% (15th)	5.6% (NR)	6.3% (18th)
31	September 5, 2017	6.6% (20th)	6.8% (19th)	5.7% (15th)	5.9% (13th)
32	September 5, 2017	7.3% (17th)	7.7% (14th)	6.3% (18th)	6.6% (14th)
33	September 11, 2017	5.8% (26th)	6.0% (NR)	5.6% (NR)	5.8% (NR)
34	September 11, 2017	6.4% (22nd)	6.8% (NR)	6.3% (NR)	6.7% (NR)
35	September 12, 2017	6.6% (15th)	7.0% (15th)	6.6% (18th)	6.9% (19th)
36	September 12, 2017	7.2% (12th)	7.4% (14th)	6.2% (NR)	6.3% (20th)
37	September 18, 2017	5.8% (24th)	6.6% (NR)	6.1% (NR)	6.9% (NR)
38	September 18, 2017	6.8% (21st)	6.9% (19th)	6.2% (NR)	6.3% (NR)
39	September 19, 2017	7.2% (16th)	7.4% (14th)	7.3% (18th)	7.5% (16th)
40	September 19, 2017	7.6% (14th)	7.7% (12th)	7.6% (17th)	7.8% (14th)
Average		6.7%	7.0%	6.8%	7.1%
In the table above, the blue numbers represent the lowest ratings and the red numbers represent the highest ratings.; NR denotes that the drama did not rank in the top 20 daily programs on that date.

== Awards and nominations ==
Year	Award	Category	Recipient	Result	Ref.
2017	10th Korea Drama Awards	Top Excellence Award, Actress	Im Yoon-ah	Nominated	
2017	MBC Drama Awards	Popularity Award, Actress	Im Yoon-ah	Nominated	
2017	MBC Drama Awards	Drama of the Year	The King in Love	Nominated	
2017	MBC Drama Awards	Golden Acting Award, Actor in a Special Project Drama	Jeong Bo-seok	Won	
2017	MBC Drama Awards	Best Young Actor	Nam Da-reum	Won	
2017	MBC Drama Awards	Best Young Actor	Yoon Chan-young	Nominated	
2017	MBC Drama Awards	Top Excellence Award, Actor in a Monday-Tuesday Drama	Im Si-wan	Nominated	
2017	MBC Drama Awards	Top Excellence Award, Actress in a Monday-Tuesday Drama	Im Yoon-ah	Nominated	
2017	MBC Drama Awards	Excellence Award, Actor in a Monday-Tuesday Drama	Hong Jong-hyun	Nominated	
2017	MBC Drama Awards	Excellence Award, Actor in a Monday-Tuesday Drama	Oh Min-suk	Nominated	
2017	MBC Drama Awards	Excellence Award, Actress in a Monday-Tuesday Drama	Jang Young-nam	Nominated	
