= Cho Pak =

Goryeo government official (1356–1408)

- Hangul: 조박
- Hanja: 趙璞
- RR: Jo Bak
- MR: Cho Pak

Art name
- Hangul: 우정
- Hanja: 雨亭
- RR: Ujeong
- MR: Ujŏng

Courtesy name
- Hangul: 안석
- Hanja: 安石
- RR: Anseok
- MR: Ansŏk

Posthumous name
- Hangul: 문평
- Hanja: 文平
- RR: Munpyeong
- MR: Munp'yŏng

Cho Pak (Korean: 조박; Hanja: 趙璞; 1356 – December 22, 1408 (Note: In the Korean calendar (lunisolar), he died on the 6th day of the 12th Lunar month of the 6th year of Taejong's reign (1408).)) was a Korean civil official during the late Goryeo and early Joseon era. The brother-in-law of King Taejong, Cho was a contributor to the founding of the Joseon dynasty.

== Biography ==
Cho Pak was born in 1356 as a member of the Pyongyang Cho clan. Cho was the son of Cho Sagyŏm (조사겸; 趙思謙), who served as chŏnŭiryŏng (전의령; 典儀令). Cho Pak's art name was Ujŏng and his courtesy name was Ansŏk. In 1382, Cho passed the literary examination.

As the brother-in-law of Yi Pangwŏn, son of Yi Sŏnggye, Cho Pak was a supporter of Yi Sŏnggye and his ambitions. As a result, Chŏng Mong-ju, Yi's political rival, demoted Cho to the post of magistrate of Cheongju. On April 23, 1392, Cho was stripped of his post as magistrate and exiled. However, Chŏng was killed and Yi Sŏnggye was able to found the new Joseon dynasty. As a reward for his contributions, Cho was awarded Dynasty Founding Merit Subject First Class (개국공신 1등), given the office of Minister of Rites (예조 전서; 禮曹 典書; yejo chŏnsŏ), and enfeoffed as the Lord of Pyeongwon (평원군; 平原君). A month after the founding of the new dynasty, Cho was also given the post of surveillance commissioner of Yanggwang Province (양광도 안렴사; 楊廣道 按廉使; Yanggwang annyŏmsa). In 1394, he was appointed as the governor of Jeolla province. However, on March 8, 1395, (Note: In the Korean calendar (lunisolar), the 17th day of the 2nd Lunar month of the 4th year of Taejo's reign (1395).) he was jailed in Gongju for his failure to conduct a head count of the provincial army. He was pardoned on April 10. (Note: In the Korean calendar (lunisolar), the 21st day of the 3rd Lunar month of the 4th year of Taejo's reign (1395).)

In 1398, Cho was appointed as inspector-general (대사헌; 大司憲; taesahŏn). He helped his in-law, prince Yi Pangwŏn, to triumph in the First Strife of the Princes and was made a merit subject. In 1400, he was exiled to Icheon for false accusations against Cho Chun. However, in the same year, he was recalled from exile and given the post of assistant grand councilor of the Chancellery (참찬문하부사; 參贊門下府事; ch'amch'an munhabu sa). In 1401, Yi Pangwŏn, now King Taejong, made Cho a merit subject for his achievements in bringing Taejong to the throne. In 1408, he was appointed the Minister of Taxation (호조판서; 戶曹判書; hojo pansŏ) and the provincial garrison commander of Tongbungmyŏn (동북면도제찰사; 東北面都體察使; Tongbungmyŏn to chech'alsa). On December 22, 1408, Cho Pak died.
