= Park Hwan-hee =

South Korean actress (born 1990)

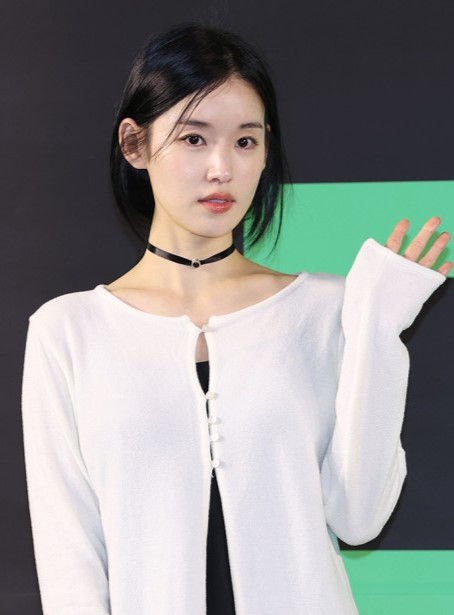
- Park in April 2023
- Born: October 13, 1990 (age 36); Masan, South Korea
- Occupations: Actress; model
- Years active: 2015–present
- Agent: Image9coms
- Spouse: Bill Stax (m. 2011; div. 2012)
- Children: Shin Seop (son)

Korean name
- Hangul: 박환희
- RR: Bak Hwanhui
- MR: Pak Hwanhŭi

Park Hwan-hee (Korean: 박환희; born October 13, 1990) is a South Korean actress and model. She began to be known for being in the 2016 popular television series Descendants of the Sun.

== Personal life ==
Park married rapper Bill Stax on July 30, 2011, and divorced 15 months later. They have one son, named Shin Seop.

== Filmography ==
=== Television series ===
Year	Title	Role	Notes	Ref.
2015	Who Are You: School 2015	Kim Kyung-jin	Cameo (ep.1)	
2016	Descendants of the Sun	Choi Min-ji		
2016	Uncontrollably Fond	teenage Ko Na-ri	Cameo (ep.2)	
2016	Don't Dare to Dream	Keum Soo-jung		
2017	The King in Love	Wang Dan		
2018	Are You Human?	Seo Ye-na		
2021	Jirisan	Hee-won	Cameo	
2023	Payback: Money and Power	young Eun Ji-hee		
2023	Numbers	Son Hye-won		
2023	The Matchmakers	Yeoju-daek		
2025	Our Unwritten Seoul	young Kim Ro-sa		

=== Music video appearances ===
Year	Song title	Artist	Ref.
2019	"Don't Say Goodbye" (헤어지지말아요, 우리)	Rocoberry and NCT's Doyoung	
