= Cho In'gyu =

Goryeo government official

- Hangul: 조인규
- Hanja: 趙仁規
- RR: Jo Ingyu
- MR: Cho In'gyu

Courtesy name
- Hangul: 거진
- Hanja: 去塵
- RR: Geojin
- MR: Kŏjin

Posthumous name
- Hangul: 정숙
- Hanja: 貞肅
- RR: Jeongsuk
- MR: Chŏngsuk

Cho In'gyu (Korean: 조인규; Hanja: 趙仁規; 1237 – May 15, 1308 (Note: In the Korean calendar (lunisolar), he died on the 25th day of the 4th Lunar month of the 34th year of Chungnyeol's reign (1208).)) was a Goryeo civil official. Originally an interpreter for the Goryeo crown prince, his success in helping arrange a marriage between the prince and Kublai Khan's daughter propelled Cho's rise in Goryeo officialdom. He would eventually become the chancellor of Goryeo by 1292 and marry his daughter to the crown prince, the future King Chungseon.

== Biography ==
Cho In'gyu was born in 1237 in Sangwŏn as the son of Cho Yŏng (조영; 趙瑩) of the Pyongyang Cho clan. Cho's family was thought to be that of originally of commoner status. Cho In'gyu learned the Mongol language, due to Sangwŏn's close proximity to the Mongol-Goryeo border during Mongol invasions of Korea. Cho's courtesy name was Kŏjin, and his posthumous name was Chŏngsuk.

In 1269, due to Cho's proficiency in the Mongol language, Cho was selected to be the interpreter for Crown Prince Sim (the future King Chungnyeol) during his visit to the Yuan capital of Khanbaliq. As an interpreter, Cho was able to cultivate a relationship with not just the crown prince, but the prince's Mongol in-laws, his wife Princess Jeguk and his father-in-law, Emperor Kublai Khan. Due to his close ties to the royal families of Goryeo and the Yuan, Cho was able to quickly rise through the ranks of Goryeo officialdom. He first was given the rank of senior colonel (중랑장; 中郎將; chungnangjang), for his services in helping arrange the marriage between the heir of Goryeo and Kublai's daughter. He would obtain the offices of lieutenant general, royal secretary, deputy commissioner of the royal secretariat, and 1292, reach the top post of chancellor.

In 1292, Cho would also arrange another marriage, this time between his own daughter, Royal Consort Cho, and the crown prince, Wang Chang (the future King Chungseon). In 1298, King Chungseon's Mongol wife, Princess Gyeguk, noticed that King Chungseon loved his other wife, Royal Consort Cho, more than her. She sent messages to the Yuan court, accusing her rival of having placed a curse on her causing the king to not love her. The Yuan arrested both Royal Consort Cho, as her family, including her father, Cho In'gyu. King Chungseon was deposed as king and his father, King Chungnyeol was re-instated as the king. When King Chungseon began his second reign as king in 1308, Cho's clan, the Pyongyang Cho clan, was listed as one of the fifteen great ministerial families (재상지종; 宰相之種; chaesangjijong), eligible for marriage with the royal House of Wang.

Cho was exiled to Anxi and would be released from exile six years later in 1306. After his return, in 1307, he was enfeoffed as the Lord of Pyongyang (평양군; 平壤君). Cho died on May 15, 1308.
