= Princess Jeguk =

Yuan princess and consort (1259–1297)

Princess Supreme of Je State 제국대장공주 齊國大長公主 Чи Гуо Да Жан гүнж
- Grand Queen Mother Inmyeong (인명왕태후; 仁明王太后)

Queen consort of Goryeo
- Tenure: 1274–1297
- Coronation: 1274
- Predecessor: Princess Gyeongchang
- Successor: Princess Gyeguk
- Born: Borjigin Qutlugh Kelmysh; 28 June 1259; Mongol Empire
- Died: 11 June 1297 (aged 38); Hyeonseong Temple, Gaegyeong, Goryeo
- Burial: September 1297; Goreung tomb
- Spouse: Chungnyeol of Goryeo (m. 1274–1297)
- Issue: Chungseon of Goryeo; Unborn daughter Unborn son
Names
- Mongolian name: Borjigin Qutugh Kelmysh (Боржигин Хутлугкэлмиш); Sino-Korean name: Pae'ajigŭn Holdoro Gerimisil (패아지근 홀도로 게리미실; 孛兒支斤 忽都魯揭里迷失)
Regnal name
- Princess Wonseong (원성공주; 元成公主; from 1275); Princess Anpyeong (안평공주; 安平公主; from 1294)
Posthumous name
- Given by Goryeo: Queen Jangmok (장목왕후; 莊穆王后); Queen Jangmok Inmyeong (장목인명왕후, 莊穆仁明王后; by King Chungnyeol); Queen Mother Inmyeong (인명태후; 仁明太后); Queen Mother Jeongmin Jangseon Inmyeong (정민장선인명태후, 貞敏莊宣仁明太后; by King Chungseon); Given by Yuan: Imperial Aunt "Princess Supreme of Je State", the Princess Consort (Queen Consort) of Goryeo State (황고 제국대장공주 고려국 왕비, 皇姑 齊國大長公主 高麗國 王妃; given in 1310 by Temür Khan)
- House: Borjigin (by birth); House of Wang (by marriage)
- Father: Kublai Khan
- Mother: Chabi khatun
- Religion: Buddhism

- Princess Jeguk
- Hangul: 제국대장공주
- Hanja: 齊國大長公主
- RR: Jeguk daejang gongju
- MR: Cheguk taejang kongju

Personal name
- Hangul: 홀도로게리미실
- Hanja: 忽都魯揭里迷失
- RR: Holdoro gerimisil
- MR: Holdoro kerimisil

Princess Supreme Jeguk (Korean: 제국대장공주; Hanja: 齊國大長公主; 28 June 1259 – 11 June 1297; (Note: In the Korean calendar (lunisolar), she was born on 28th day of the 6th month of 1259 and died on 21st day of the 5th month of 1297.) lit. 'Princess-Aunt of the State of Je'), also known as Queen Jangmok (장목왕후; 莊穆王后) and Queen Mother Inmyeong (인명태후; 仁明太后) was a Yuan imperial princess as the daughter of Kublai Khan and Chabi khatun. She became the first Goryeo queen consort from Yuan. She was the primary wife of Chungnyeol of Goryeo and the mother of his successor, Chungseon of Goryeo. Her personal name was Borjigin Qutlugh Kelmysh (Mongolian: Боржигин Хутлугкэлмиш).

She was the great-granddaughter of Genghis Khan and was known as a princess supreme (daejang gongju, 大長公主) as the aunt of the Emperor. She was the aunt of Temür Khan, who later succeeded her father as the Yuan emperor. From all of Mongol consorts in Goryeo, just she who was Yuan Emperor's daughter.

== Biography ==
=== Early life ===
Borjigin Qutugh Kelmysh (보르지긴 쿠틀룩 켈미쉬 [홀도로게리미실 or 홀독겁미사], 孛兒支斤 忽都魯揭里迷失) was born on 28 June 1259 in Mongol Empire as the youngest daughter (Imperial Princess) of Kublai Khan and Chabi khatun.

=== Marriage relation with Goryeo ===
At 15 years old on 11 May 1274, she married the 39-years-old Crown Prince Wang Geo of Goryeo and after he ascended the throne as the new king, she became his Queen Consort and bypassed his firstly-married wife who was the granddaughter of Duke Yangyang due to Goryeo's status as a vassal state of the Mongol Empire following the Mongol Invasions of Korea.

After she came to Goryeo, Qutugh Kelmysh brought her own servants and they continued to practice Mongol customs, Chungnyeol even scolded the priests for not changing their hair in the Yuan style. This made Mongolian customs became more prevalent in Goryeo. As one of Mongolian custom, Qutugh built a Mongolian-style tent called Gung-ryeo (궁려; 穹廬) and held an amulet rite of her ancestors using white sheep's oil.

=== Palace life ===
On 6 January 1275, Qutugh was honoured as Princess Wonseong (원성공주; 元成公主; lit. 'the Primary and Constructive Princess') while lived in Wonseong Hall, Gyeongseong Palace (경성궁 원성전; 敬成宮 元成殿). Under Chungnyeol's order, "Eungseon" (응선; 膺善) was established in her honor. It was said that the Princess enjoyed banquets, even after her mother died. Also, if someone was close with her, they would be released quickly even if committed a serious crime. Cho In-gyu, who embezzled the State's wealth and acquitted innocent people, was quickly released from Guiyang since he close to the princess and later rose to the position of Inspector General (감찰대부).

She cared for the people and urged Chungnyeol, who frequently hunted, to stop hunting and put effort into the affairs of the country and she was also said to have been very strict and strong, but bright. She was unforgiving towards even close associates who made mistakes. In the following year, exactly on 20 October 1275, she gave birth into their first son, Wang Jang (then known as King Chungseon) in Sapan Palace (사판궁; 沙坂宮).

In December, a banquet was held to celebrate the newborn Prince's birth. However, when Chungnyeol ordered that she and his first wife be placed in the same position, she thought that she and his first wife were treated as equals and became very angry with suddenly moved Jeongsin's seat.

In May 1276, she and Chungnyeol visited Heungwang Temple (흥왕사) and while she took the gold pagoda from that Temple into the palace, the decorations for the pagoda were stolen by the servants Holadae (홀라대; 忽刺歹) and Samga (삼가; 三哥), who followed her to Goryeo. Qutugh originally intended to dismantle it and use it privately, but when Chungnyeol prevented it, she cried. When they got back to there, Heungwang Temple's members begged her to the return the gold pagoda of the gold tower, but she refused.

In 1277, she gave birth into their daughter, who died not long after that. One year later, she gave birth again into their second son, but the son passed away as well.

Later, Wang Jong married Qutugh Kelmysh and tried to ascend the throne. Upon received this report, Chungnyeol ordered his ministers to studied Gyeongchang and protected Wang Jong. However, in this case, the ministers insisted that the destruction of property should also be directed by the Yuan dynasty, so they decided to follow the confiscated policy. Since she strongly insisted on skipping this procedure and confiscating the property, their property was eventually confiscated under her command. Afterwards, under Yuan dynasty's direction, on 16 September 1277, Gyeongchang was deposed from her position and reduced to commoner status and Wang Jong was exiled to Gueum-do (구음도; 仇音島).

On 20 March 1281, Chungnyeol was given Yuan Imperial title Prince Consort [King] of State (부마국왕; 駙馬國王) since he was one of their Princess's husband. In the next year, as the father-in-law, Kublai Khan gave the best medical officer from Song Dynasty to Chungnyeol, named Yeon Deok-sin (연덕신; 鍊德新) and his medicine was said to made strengthens Chungnyeol's stamina. However, Goryeo astronomer O Yun-bu (오윤부) said, "This medicine is not good for the king's body and this make prevent the descendants from prospering." After the King took the medicine, the Princess never became pregnant again.

Then, on 29 June 1294, Qutugh Kelmysh was given the new title as Princess Anpyeong (안평공주; 安平公主; lit. 'the Calm and Peaceful Princess') by her nephew, Temür Khan. During her lifetime, she was said for tried to devote herself to the national affairs and helped her husband in government.

=== Later life and death ===
In 1297, she went to Hyanggak, Sugang Palace (수강궁) and ordered the servants to pick up a peony in full bloom. Then she looked at this peony for a long time and sobbed. After a while, she fell ill and three days later, she and her husband traveled to Hyeonseong Temple (현성사; 賢聖寺), where she died, she was 38 years old.

She was buried in Goreung Tomb (고릉; 高陵) and then received her posthumous names in September. Around 1297, her son, murdered his father's concubine, Lady Si and said that his mother's illness was caused by the speculation of the former King's favor. After exiling, killing or imprisoning several people related to his mother, a beautiful widow (later known as Consort Won), was dedicated to King Chungnyeol and shocked by this, he then abdicated his throne to Chungseon and resigned as King Emeritus.

After Wang Won ascended the throne in 1298, he honored his mother as Queen Mother Inmyeong (인명태후; 仁明太后) along with visited Myoryeon Temple (묘련사; 妙蓮寺), her original temple. At this time, both of King of Jin (진왕; 晉王) and King Go of Dang (고당왕; 高唐王) sent their peoples to mourn and honor her. In 1310, Temür Khan honoured his aunt as Imperial Aunt, the Princess Supreme of Je State (제국대장공주; 齊國大長公主) and enshrined in Chungnyeol's shrine.

=== Others ===
Some scholars evaluated that Princess Jeguk was treated completely differently from the previous Goryeo Queen consorts and that she exercised more powerful authority than the King because of her status as a Yuan Dynasty Imperial Princess. In addition, there were evaluation that she wasted her national treasury on her immortality because she believed in Buddhism too much.

== Family ==
- Father: Kublai Khan of Yuan (쿠빌라이 칸; 23 September 1215 – 18 February 1294)
  - Grandfather: Tolui Khan of Mongol Empire (툴루이 칸; 1192–1232)
  - Grandmother: Sorghaghtani Beki (소르칵타니; 1191–1252)
- Mother: Chabi Khatun of Yuan (차비 카툰; 1216 – 20 March 1281)
  - Grandfather: Anchin of Khongirad
- Husband: King Chungryeol of Goryeo (고려 충렬왕; 3 April 1236 – 30 July 1308)
  - Son: King Chungseon of Goryeo (고려 충선왕; 20 October 1275 – 23 June 1325)
    - Daughter-in-law: Grand Princess Gyeguk of the Borjigin clan (계국대장공주; ?–1315)
  - Son: Unnamed son (1278–?)
  - Daughter: Unnamed daughter (1277–?)

== In popular culture ==
- Portrayed by Jang Young-nam and Kim Bo-ra in the 2017 MBC TV series The King in Love.

== See also ==
- Goryeo under Mongol rule
