= Royal Consort Wonbi Kim =

Goryeo consort (fl. 13th century)

Lady Sukchang

Royal consort of Goryeo Won-bi (원비, 院妃)
- Monarch: King Chungnyeol

Royal consort of Goryeo Suk-bi (숙비, 淑妃)
- Monarch: King Chungseon
- Spouse: Choe Mun; Chungnyeol of Goryeo; Chungseon of Goryeo
Posthumous name
- Sukchang (숙창, 淑昌; "Charming and Prosperity")
- House: Eonyang Kim (by birth)
- Father: Kim Yang-gam
- Mother: Lady, of the Jeongju Jeong clan
- Religion: Buddhism

Korean name
- Hangul: 숙창원비 언양김씨
- Hanja: 淑昌院妃 彦陽金氏
- Revised Romanization: Sukchang-wonbi Eonyanggimssi
- McCune–Reischauer: Sukch'ang-wonbi Ŏnyang'kimssh'i

Lady Kim of the Eonyang Kim clan was a widow who became a concubine during the Goryeo dynasty, first serving King Chungnyeol and later his son, King Chungseon. She was known as Won-bi (Korean: 원비; Hanja: 院妃; lit. 'Primary Consort') during Chungnyeol's reign, and Suk-bi (숙비; 淑妃; lit. 'Pure Consort') during Chungseon's reign.

== Biography ==
=== Early life and relatives ===
The future Lady Sukchang, who was an outstanding beauty during her lifetime, was born into the Eonyang Kim clan, as the seventh child of Kim Yang-gam and Lady Jeong, the great-granddaughter of Jeong Mun-cheong from the Jeongju Jeong clan. She had three older brothers (Kim Gwang-gye, Kim Gwang-yeon and Kim Mun-yeon, Prince Eonyang), three older sisters and one younger sister.

Ancestors of Royal Consort Wonbi Kim

Kim Chwi-ryeo 김취려
Kim Jeon 김전
Kim Yang-gam 김양감
Lady Sukchang of the Eonyang Kim clan 숙창 언양 김씨
Jeong Jang 정장
Jeong Jun 정준
Lady Jeong of the Jeongju Jeong clan 부인 정주 정씨

=== Marriage and palace life ===
==== First marriage ====
Lady Kim firstly married Choi Mun (최문; 崔文). However, they produced no children and he died early, making her a widow at a young age. But considering the social customs of that time, her widowhood wasn't a big problem.

==== Second marriage ====
After Crown Prince Won killed one of the consorts of King Chungnyeol, he gave Lady Kim to his father. In 1297, she was honoured with the title of Won-bi (원비; 院妃). She had no children with Chungnyeol.

==== Third marriage ====
After King Chungnyeol's death in 1308, Lady Kim formed a good relationship with King Chungseon, who frequently visited Kim Mun-yeon's house. She was given the title of Suk-bi (숙비; 淑妃). Kim Mun-yeon was elevated to Cheomuisirangchanseongsa (첨의시랑찬성사), an official of the second rank.

While this happened, the inspector general, U Tak, and some of the officials, disproved of the King of having a relationship with his late father's concubine, so they then went to the palace and raised the Jibusangso (지부상소; 持斧上疏) for the King to reconsider his actions. It was speculated that King Chungseon took Lady Kim as a wife by following the Mongolian custom, where it was acceptable for the son to take his father's concubines, except for his biological mother and his father's primary wife. The Goryeosa, written by Joseon Confucian scholars, criticized the conduct of the King in taking Lady Kim as his consort.

Because Chungseon was greatly favoured by Yuan's Empress, he asked her to gift Lady Kim a gogo (고고), a unique Mongolian headdress. It is said that after receiving the gift, Lady Kim held a banquet for the Mongol envoy.

To honour her mother, Lady Jeong, Suk-bi held a banquet attended by ministers. When she held another banquet at Eunjawon (은자원), the ministers participated again.

The clothes she usually wore were no different from that of the Queen. She did not have a good relationship with the King's sixth consort, Heo Sun-bi, since Lady Heo had also received a gogo from Yuan. During a banquet, the two women changed their outfits five times to show off their luxurious clothes and gogo.

In 1312 (Chungseon's 4th year of reign), the King built a private house for Lady Kim in Samhyeon (삼현), and 13 years later, while the King's body was transferred from Yuan to Goryeo, his mortuary was also set up in Suk-bi's palace.

There are no records left about the date of Lady Kim's death or the location of her tomb. She was posthumously honoured as Lady Sukchang, Royal Consort Won of the Eonyang Kim clan (숙창원비 언양 김씨; 淑昌院妃 彦陽 金氏).
