= Duke An'gyŏng =

Disputed king of Goryeo in 1269

Marquess of An'gyŏng (안경후; 安慶侯)
- Reign: ?–1269

Duke of An'gyŏng (안경공; 安慶公)
- Reign: 1253–1269
- Coronation: 1253

King of Goryeo (disputed)
- Reign: 1269–1269
- Coronation: 1269
- Predecessor: Wonjong of Goryeo
- Successor: Wonjong of Goryeo
- Regent: Im Yŏn
- Born: Wang Gan; August 1223; Kaegyŏng, Goryeo
- Died: October ? Ganghwa Island, Ganghwa-hyeon, Goryeo
- Spouse: Deposed Queen, of the Andong Gwon clan
- Issue: Wang Hyeon, Marquess Hanyang; Wang Cheong, Prince Ikyang
- House: Wang
- Dynasty: Goryeo
- Father: Gojong
- Mother: Queen Anhye
- Religion: Buddhism

Korean name
- Hangul: 왕창
- Hanja: 王淐
- RR: Wang Chang
- MR: Wang Ch'ang

Monarch name
- Hangul: 영종
- Hanja: 英宗
- RR: Yeongjong
- MR: Yŏngjong

Former name
- Hangul: 왕간
- Hanja: 王侃
- RR: Wang Gan
- MR: Wang Kan

Duke of An'gyŏng (Korean: 안경공; Hanja: 安慶公; August 1223 – October ?), personal name Wang Ch'ang (왕창; 王淐), also known by his temple name as Yŏngjong (영종; 英宗), was briefly king of the Korean Goryeo dynasty in 1269 installed by the Goryeo military regime. He was the second son of King Gojong and the only full younger brother of King Wonjong. He was known before his reign as the Marquess of An'gyŏng and Duke of An'gyŏng. Although he was given the temple name of Yeongjong by the Goryeo court, his reign's legitimacy is not widely recognized by modern-day scholars.

In 1253, 1259, 1265 and 1266, he visited the Yuan dynasty as an envoy when Goryeo dispatched a negotiating envoy. In 1269, he ascended the throne with the help of the government official Im Yŏn. Not a year after, he was deposed under Yuan's pressure. King Gongyang tried to made a burial at his grave, but canceled due to the opposition from his ministers.

== Family ==
- Father: Gojong of Goryeo
  - Grandfather: Myeongjong of Goryeo
  - Grandmother: Queen Uijeong of the Gangneung Kim clan
- Mother: Queen Anhye of the Yu clan
  - Grandfather: Huijong of Goryeo
  - Grandmother: Queen Seongpyeong of the Jangheung Im clan
- Consorts and their Respective issue(s):
  - Deposed Queen, of the Andong Kwon clan; daughter of Kwon Tak (권탁).
    - Wang Hyeon, Marquess Hanyang (한양후 왕현)
    - Wang Cheong, Prince Ikyang (익양군 왕청; March 1248 – March 1344)
