= Jeondeungsa =

Oldest extant Buddhist temple in Korea

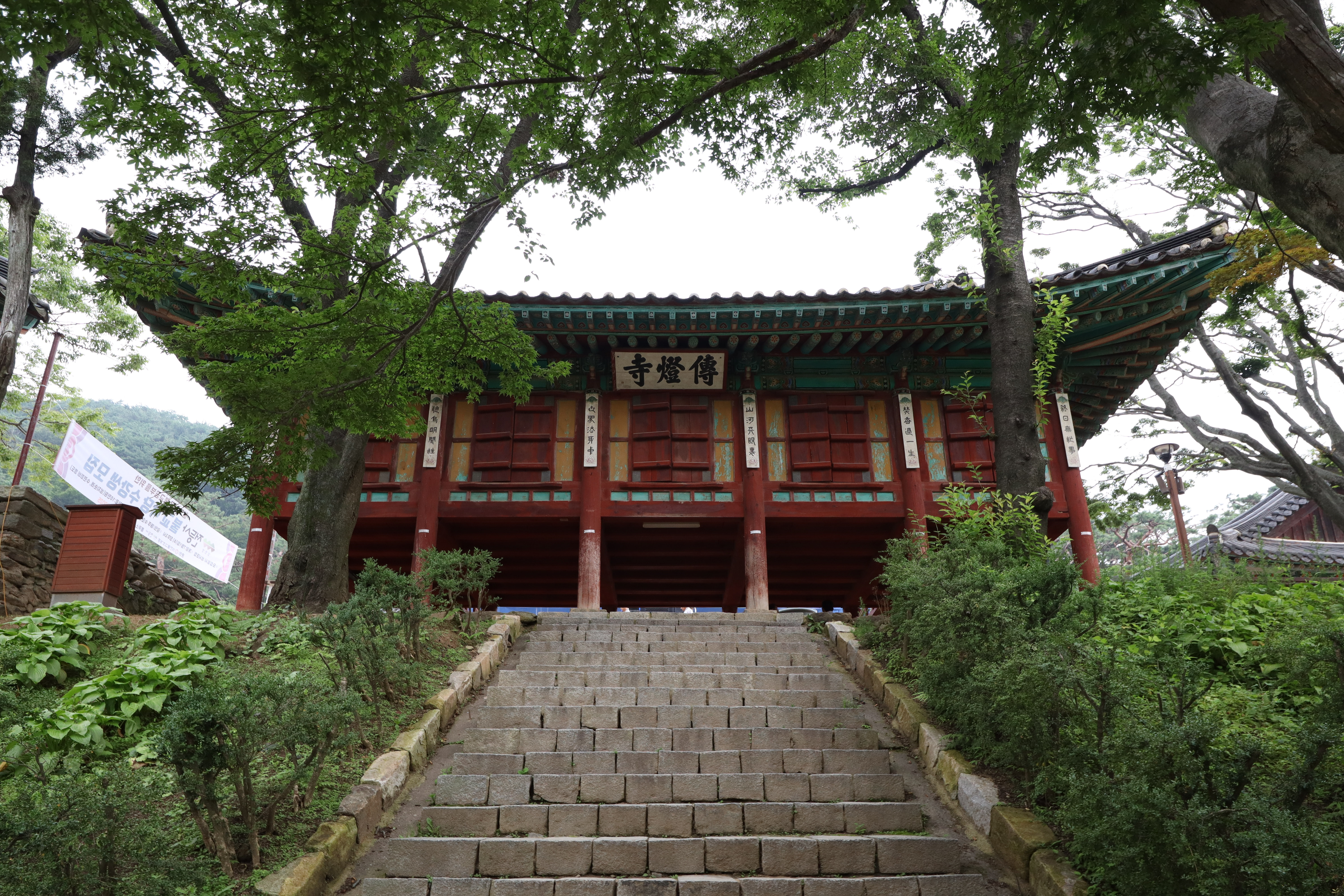

- Location within South Korea

Religion
- Affiliation: Jogye Order of Korean Buddhism

Location
- Location: 37-41, Jeondeungsa-ro, Gilsang-myeon, Ganghwa-gun, Incheon, South Korea
- Country: South Korea
- Coordinates: 37°37′55.1″N 126°29′03.7″E

Korean name
- Hangul: 전등사
- Hanja: 傳燈寺
- RR: Jeondeungsa
- MR: Chŏndŭngsa

Jeondeungsa (Korean: 전등사) is a Buddhist temple located on Ganghwa Island, Incheon, South Korea. It is the oldest extant Buddhist temple in the entire Korean peninsula, having been founded in the year 381, during the Goguryeo period.

The entirety of the temple is located within the Samnang Fortress.

Jeondeungsa participates in the Templestay program, in which visitors can stay at the temple and experience Buddhist culture.

== Gallery ==
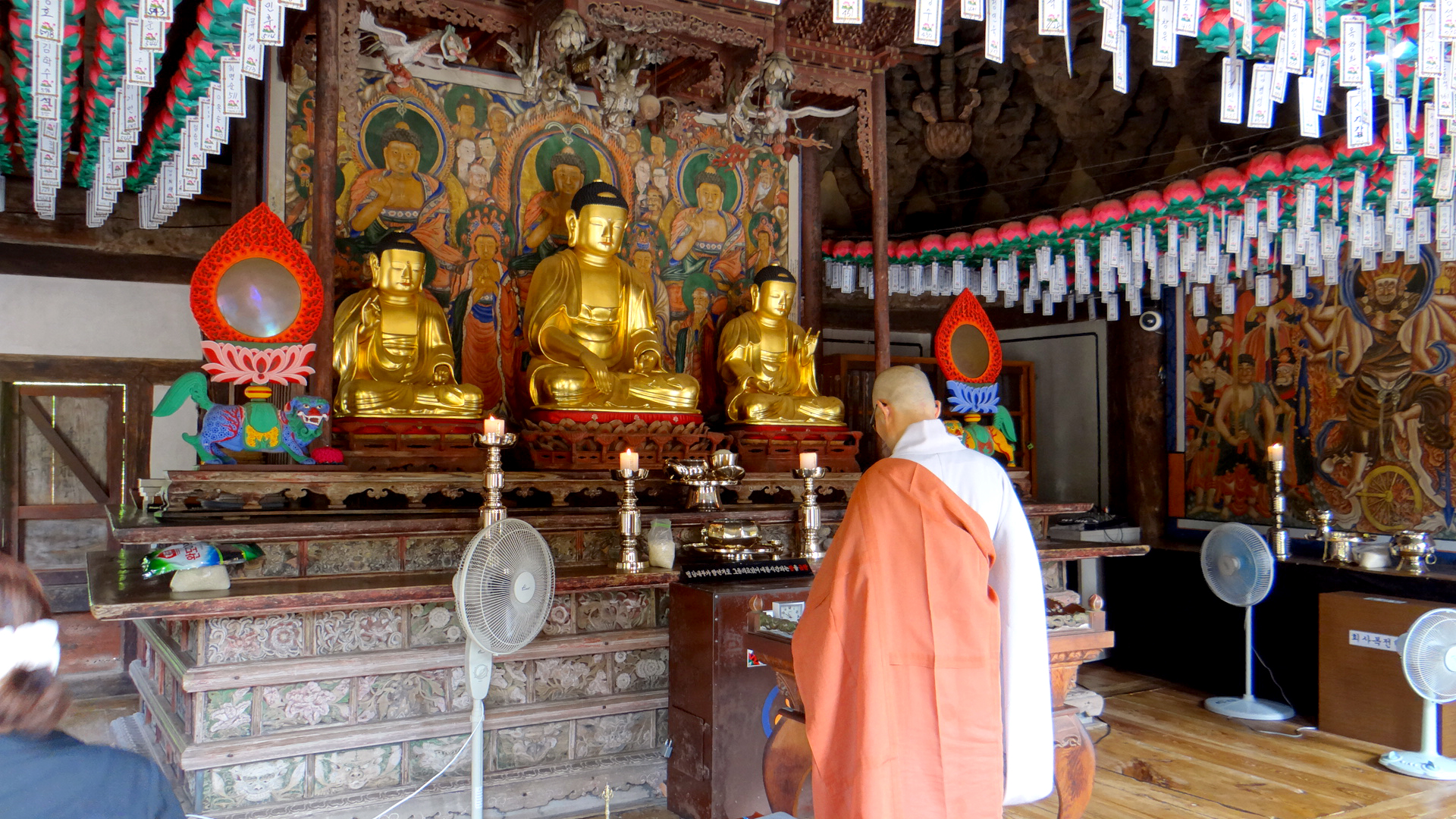
Inside Daeungjeon, the main worship hall (2013)

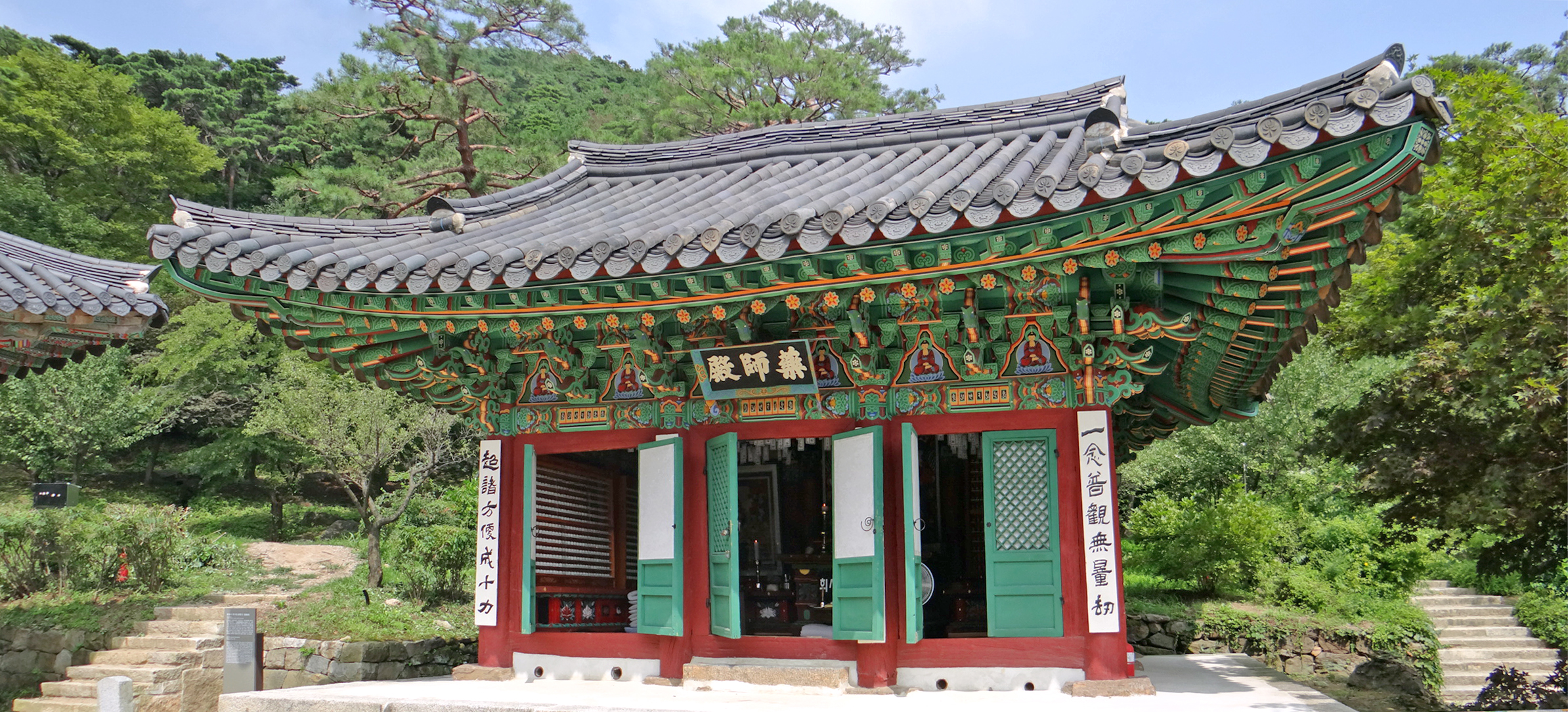
The Yaksajeon hall, where the Medicine Buddha is enshrined (2013)

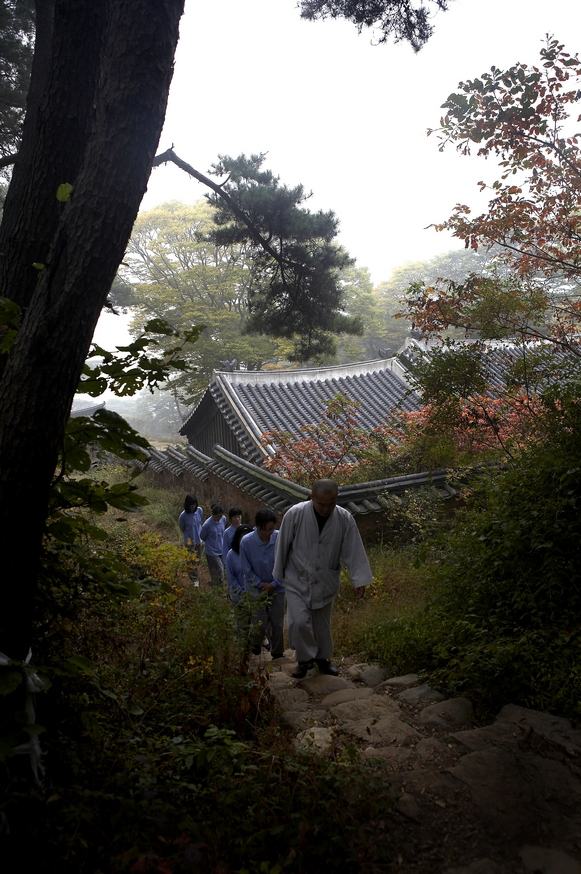
Monk and Templestay guests walk up a wooded path in the temple (2008)

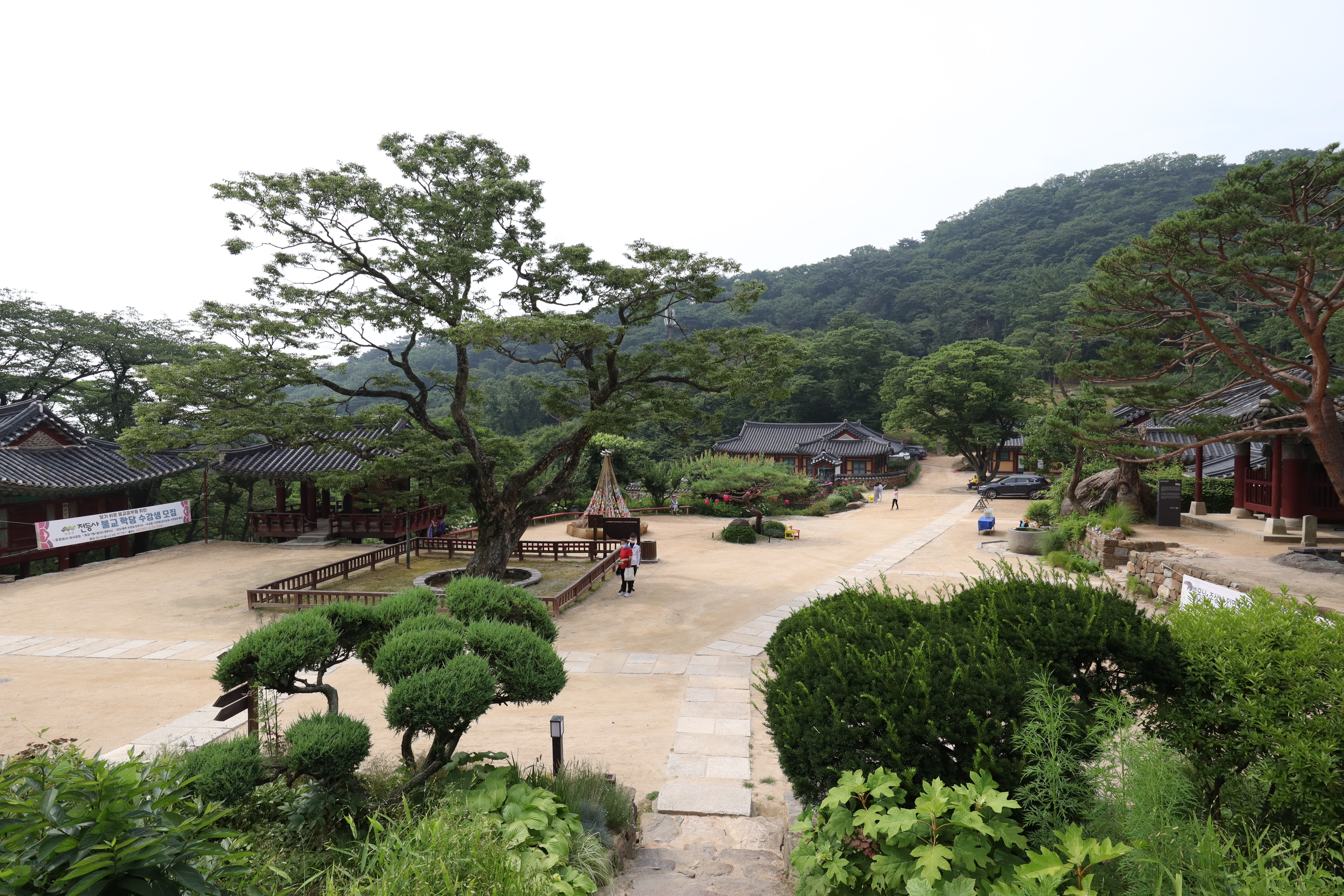
Temple courtyard (2020)

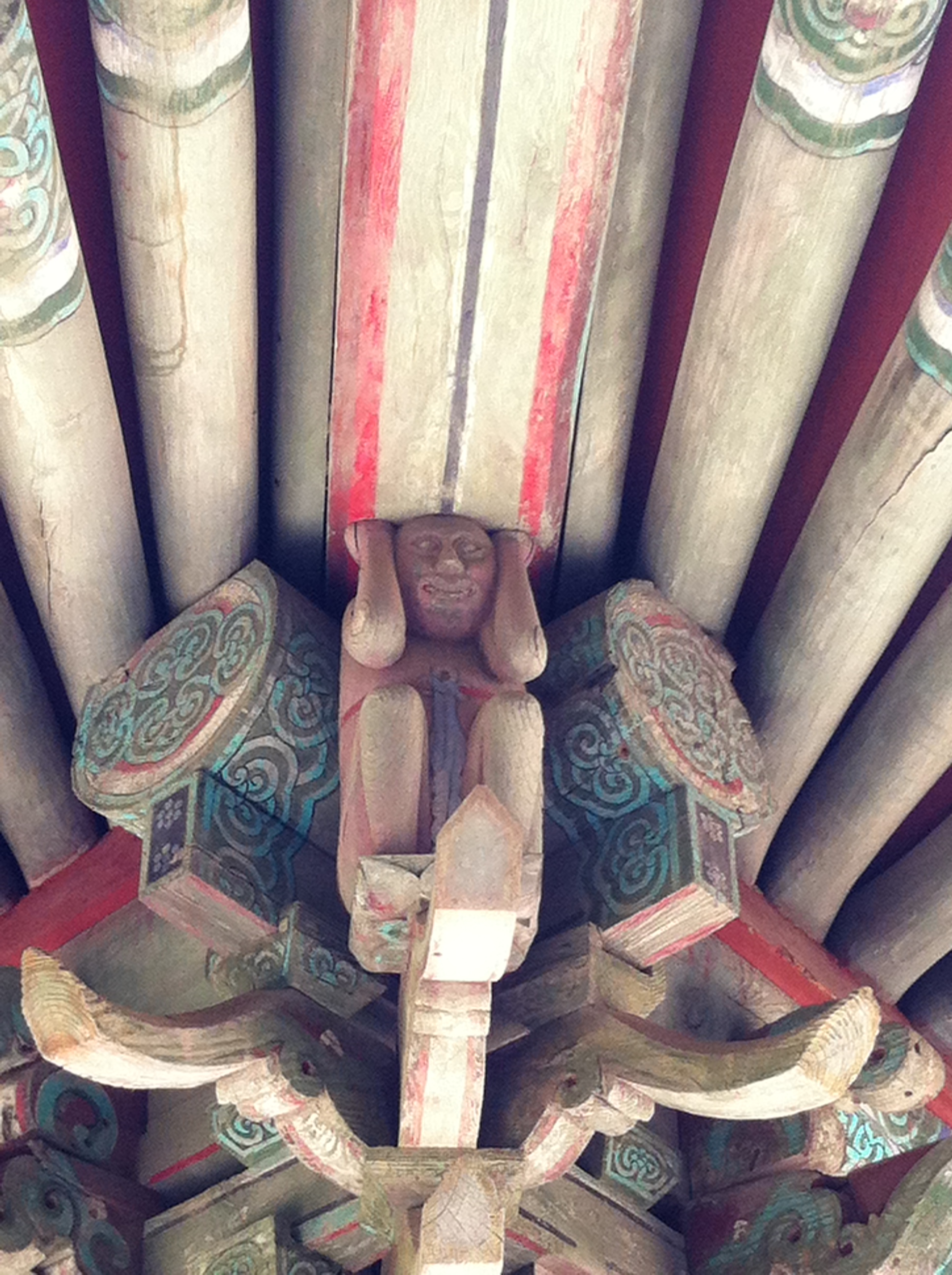
Wooden figure of a naked woman on the roof (2012)

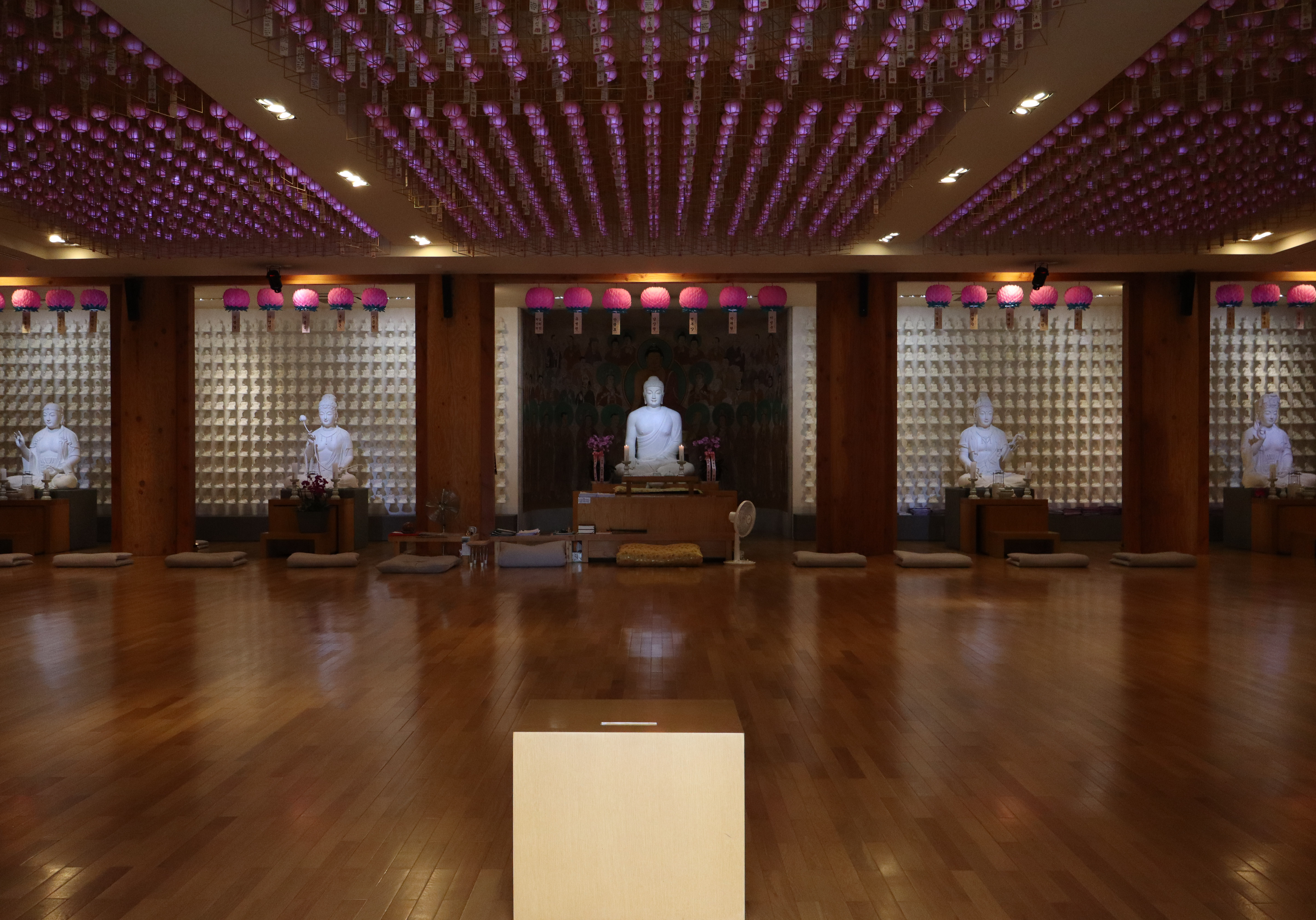
Inside one of the halls (2020)
