= Toqto'a Buqa =

King of Shen (r. 1354–1376)

Toghtua Bukha (Middle Mongolian: ᠲᠣᠭᠲᠠᠬᠤ ᠪᠤᠬ᠎ᠠ; Toγtoγa Buqa; died 1376), also Toqto'a-Buqa, was a member of the House of Wang of the Goryeo dynasty. He was a grandson of Wang Ko. High-placed in the imperial court, he later became Prince of Shen (瀋王) (Sim Prince) of the Mongol-led Yuan dynasty. He was a competitor to King Gongmin who competed for the Goryeo throne.

After his grandfather died, he succeeded his grandfather's position as Prince of Shen in 1354. Empress Öljei Khutugh and her son, Crown Prince Ayushiridara (Emperor Zhaozong of Northern Yuan) tried to replace Gongmin of Goryeo because he had exterminated the Ki family in 1356. They tried to install Toghtua Bukha, but was declined. Toghtua Bukha expected Goryeo to welcome him as king's death because the king had no legitimate son.

The Yuan dynasty was overthrown by the Ming dynasty in 1368 and King Gongmin kept pro-Ming policies. His assassination in 1374 reignited the race for successor. Yi Inim's faction finally installed Wang U as Goryeo king but the Northern Yuan dynasty (rump state of the Yuan dynasty) attempted to appoint Toghtua Bukha. An Sagi (安師琦) also supported him in Goryeo and asked him to return to Goryeo. This group was, however, destroyed by the mainstream faction in 1374. Toghtua Bukha's activity during this strife is almost unknown, but he seems to stayed in Naghachu's camp in Manchuria and watched for a chance. After his death, the noble title of Prince of Shen was abolished.

== See also ==
- History of Korea
- History of China

Preceded by Wang Jeo	King Shen(Sim) of Yang; 1354–1376	Succeeded by Title abolished due to the Yuan dynasty ended
