= Royal Consort Cho =

Goryeo consort (fl. 14th century)

Cho-bi 조비
- Royal consort of Goryeo
- Spouse: Chungseon of Goryeo
- House: Pyongyang Cho clan
- Father: Cho In-gyu
- Religion: Buddhism

Royal Consort Cho (Korean: 조비; Hanja: 趙妃), also known as Princess Consort (Queen) Chungseon (충선왕비; 忠宣王妃), was the fifth wife of King Chungseon of Goryeo.
