= Queen Anhye =

Queen Anhye 안혜왕후
- Grand Queen Mother Anhye (안혜왕태후; 安惠王太后)

Princess of Goryeo
- Reign: ?–1218
- Successor: Princess Yeongchang
- Monarch: Wang Yeong, King Huijong

Queen consort of Goryeo
- Tenure: 1218–1232
- Coronation: 1218
- Predecessor: Queen Wondeok
- Successor: Princess Gyeongchang
- Born: 1195; Goryeo
- Died: 1 June 1232 (aged 36–37); Goryeo
- Spouse: Gojong of Goryeo (m. 1211–1232)
- Issue: Princess Suheung; Lady Wang; Wonjong of Goryeo; Yeongjong of Goryeo
Regnal name
- Princess Seungbok (승복궁주, 承福宮主; 1211 – 14 April 1218)
Posthumous name
- Janghye (장혜, 莊惠; "Solemn and Kind") later Anhye (안혜, 安惠; "Calm and Kind")
- House: Yu (official); Wang (agnatic and by marriage)
- Father: Huijong of Goryeo
- Mother: Queen Seongpyeong

Queen Anhye of the Yu clan (Korean: 안혜왕후 유씨; Hanja: 安惠王后 柳氏; 1195 – 1 June 1232) or formally called as Grand Queen Mother Anhye (Korean: 안혜왕태후; Hanja: 安惠王太后) was a Goryeo princess as the first and oldest daughter of King Huijong and Queen Seongpyeong who became a queen consort through her marriage with her second cousin, King Gojong as his first and primary wife.

== Biography ==
The future Queen Anhye was born as the first daughter (Royal Princess) of Huijong of Goryeo and Queen Seongpyeong. She later married her second cousin, Gojong of Goryeo and changed her clan into Yu (유씨). Her mother-in-law, Queen Wondeok was initially her aunt and the daughter of Princess Changrak who also changed her clan to Yu.

In 1211, she was honoured as Princess Seungbok (승복궁주; 承福宮主) not long after her marriage with Gojong and lived in "Seungbok Palace" (승복궁; 承福宮). She then formally became a Queen Consort following her husband's ascension to the throne in 1218. They had two daughters (born in 1213 and 1215) and two sons (in 1219 and 1223).

She died on June 1, 1232 (in 19th year reign of her husband) and her husband wore mourning clothes for three days and grieved over her death. The then-military ruler Ch'oe U gave her a coffin made of gold and silver. At the time she died, her parents were still alive and were said to be sad when they heard the news.

After her death, Gojong didn't remarry again, so it was presumed that they had a good relationship both as cousins and spouse. She then received her posthumous name and honoured as Queen Mother (태후; 太后) after their oldest son ascended the throne as King Wonjong in 1260.

== In popular culture ==
- Portrayed by Han Ye-in in the 2003–2004 KBS TV series Age of Warriors.
