= T'aesangwang =

Title for a retired king or emperor of Korea

- Hangul: 태상왕
- Hanja: 太上王
- RR: Taesangwang
- MR: T'aesangwang

Taesanghwang
- Hangul: 태상황
- Hanja: 太上皇
- RR: Taesanghwang
- MR: T'aesanghwang

Sangwang
- Hangul: 상왕
- Hanja: 上王
- RR: Sangwang
- MR: Sangwang

Sanghwang
- Hangul: 상황
- Hanja: 上皇
- RR: Sanghwang
- MR: Sanghwang

T'aesangwang (Korean: 태상왕; Hanja: 太上王; lit. ''Grand King Emeritus'') and the related title T'aesanghwang (태상황; 太上皇; lit. ''Grand Emperor Emeritus'') are titles used at various points in Korean history for retired kings or emperors. The terms Sangwang (상왕; 上王; lit. ''King Emeritus'') and Sanghwang (상황; 上皇; lit. ''Emperor Emeritus'') have also been used similarly.

== History ==
Taejo of Goguryeo was the first monarch recorded in the Samguk Sagi to abdicate (in favor of his son Suseong).

The last retired monarch was Emperor Gojong of the Korean Empire.

== List of Korean monarchs who abdicated ==
=== Goryeo ===
- Chungnyeol
- Chungseon
- Chungsuk

=== Joseon ===
- Taejo
- Jeongjong
- Taejong
- Danjong
- Sejo

=== Korean Empire ===
- Gojong

== See also ==
- Korean nobility
- Taishang Huang
- Daijō Tennō
- Korean imperial titles
