= Gojong of Goryeo =

King of Goryeo from 1213 to 1259

Gojong

King of Goryeo
- Reign: 1213–1259
- Coronation: 1213; Gang'an Hall, Gaegyeong
- Predecessor: Gangjong of Goryeo
- Successor: Wonjong of Goryeo
- Born: Wang Jil; 1192; Gaegyeong, Goryeo
- Died: 1259 (aged 66–67); Yugyeong's house, Ganghwa County, Goryeo
- Burial: Hongneung (홍릉; 洪陵); San–180, Gukhwa-ri, Ganghwa-eup, Ganghwa County, Incheon
- Spouse: Queen Anhye (m. 1211; died 1232)
- Issue: Wonjong of Goryeo; Yeongjong of Goryeo; Princess Suheung; A daughter
Posthumous name
- Great King Anhyo (안효대왕, 安孝大王; given by Goryeo dynasty); King Chungheon (충헌왕, 忠憲王; given by Yuan dynasty in 1310)
Temple name
- Gojong (고종; 高宗)
- House: Wang
- Father: Gangjong of Goryeo
- Mother: Queen Wondeok
- Religion: Buddhism

Korean name
- Hangul: 왕철
- Hanja: 王皞
- RR: Wang Cheol
- MR: Wang Ch'ŏl

Monarch name
- Hangul: 고종
- Hanja: 高宗
- RR: Gojong
- MR: Kojong

Courtesy name
- Hangul: 대명, 천우
- Hanja: 大明, 天祐
- RR: Daemyeong, Cheonu
- MR: Taemyŏng, Ch'ŏnu

Posthumous name
- Hangul: 안효대왕
- Hanja: 安孝大王
- RR: Anhyo daewang
- MR: Anhyo taewang

Former name
- Hangul: 왕질
- Hanja: 王晊
- RR: Wang Jil
- MR: Wang Chil

Gojong (1192–1259), personal name Wang Cheol, was the 23rd king of the Korean Goryeo dynasty, ruling from 1213 to 1259. Gojong's reign was marked by prolonged conflict with the Mongol Empire, which sought to conquer Goryeo, ending only to settle peace in 1259. During his reign actual power rested with the Choe family of military dictators.

== Biography ==
Although ascending to the throne in 1213, Gojong did not wield much power due to decades of military rule over Goryeo. In 1216, the Khitan invaded Goryeo but was defeated. In August 1232, Gojong moved the capital of Goryeo from Songdo to the island of Ganghwa and started the construction of significant defenses there, in order to better defend from the Mongol threat. Gojong resisted the Mongol invasion for nearly thirty years before the kingdom was forced to make peace with the Mongols in 1259; Gojong died soon after.

In 1251, the carving of the Tripitaka Koreana, a collection of Buddhist scriptures recorded on some 81,000 wooden blocks, was completed. The work was perhaps motivated by Gojong's hopes to change fortunes through the act of religious devotion; however the originals were later destroyed by the Mongols — the existing Tripitaka is a replica of Gojong's original, and was commissioned around one hundred years after the originals were lost.

Gojong was married to Queen Anhye, daughter of Huijong, the twenty-first king of Goryeo. His tomb is located near the city of Incheon.

== Family ==
- Father: Gangjong of Goryeo
  - Grandfather: Myeongjong of Goryeo
  - Grandmother: Queen Uijeong of the Gangneung Kim clan
- Mother: Queen Wondeok of the Kaeseong Wang clan
  - Grandfather: Wang Seong, Marquess Sinan
  - Grandmother: Princess Changrak
- Consorts and their Respective issue(s):
1. Queen Anhye of the Yu clan, second cousin.
  1. Crown Prince Wang Sik, 1st son
  2. Wang Chang, Duke Angyeong, 2nd son
  3. Princess Suheung, 1st daughter
  4. 2nd daughter

== In popular culture ==
- Portrayed by Oh Hyeon-cheol in the 2003–2004 KBS TV series Age of Warriors.
- Portrayed by Lee Seung-hyo in the 2012 MBC TV series God of War.

== See also ==
- History of Korea
- Rulers of Korea
- Mongol invasions of Korea

Gojong of Goryeo House of Wang Born: 3 February 1192 Died: 21 July 1259
Regnal titles
Preceded by Gangjong	King of Goryeo; 1213–1259	Succeeded by Wonjong
