= Wonjong of Goryeo =

King of Goryeo from 1260 to 1274

Wonjong 원종 元宗

King of Goryeo
- First reign: 1260–1269
- Coronation: 1260
- Predecessor: Gojong of Goryeo
- Successor: Yeongjong of Goryeo
- Second reign: 1269–1274
- Coronation: 1269
- Predecessor: Yeongjong of Goryeo
- Successor: Chungnyeol of Goryeo

King Emeritus of Goryeo
- Reign: 1269–1269 (five months)
- Coronation: 1269
- Predecessor: Position established
- Successor: King Emeritus Wang Sim
- Born: Wang Jeon; 5 April 1219; Gaegyeong, Goryeo
- Died: 23 July 1274 (aged 55); Jesang Palace, Gaegyeong, Goryeo
- Burial: Soreung (소릉; 韶陵)
- Spouse: Queen Jeongsun (m. 1235; died 1237) Princess Gyeongchang (m. 1244–1274)
- Issue: Sons: Wang Geo Wang Tae Wang Jong Wang Ikjang; Daughters: A daughter Princess Gyeongan Princess Hamnyeong
Posthumous name
- Great King Sunhyo (순효대왕, 順孝大王; given by Goryeo dynasty); King Chunggyeong (충경왕, 忠敬王; given by Yuan dynasty in 1310)
Temple name
- Wonjong (원종; 元宗)
- House: Wang
- Dynasty: Goryeo
- Father: Gojong of Goryeo
- Mother: Queen Anhye
- Religion: Buddhism

- Korean name
- Hangul: 왕전
- Hanja: 王倎
- RR: Wang Jeon
- MR: Wang Chŏn

Monarch name
- Hangul: 원종
- Hanja: 元宗
- RR: Wonjong
- MR: Wŏnjong

Courtesy name
- Hangul: 일신
- Hanja: 日新
- RR: Ilsin
- MR: Ilsin

Posthumous name
- Hangul: 순효대왕
- Hanja: 順孝大王
- RR: Sunhyo daewang
- MR: Sunhyo taewang

Former names
- Hangul: 왕전, 왕식
- Hanja: 王倎, 王植
- RR: Wang Jeon, Wang Sik
- MR: Wang Chŏn, Wang Sik

Wŏnjong (5 April 1219 – 23 July 1274), personal name Wang Jŏn, was the 24th ruler of the Goryeo dynasty of Korea, reigning from 1260 to 1274. His rule was briefly interrupted by that of King Yeongjong in 1269, although the legitimacy of the latter is disputed by scholars.

== Biography ==
His father, Gojong of Goryeo, sent Wonjong when he was the Crown Prince, to meet with Kublai Khan to negotiate with the Mongols after decades of warfare during the Mongol invasions of Korea. During this time, Kublai was in the middle of a power struggle with Ariq Böke whom was residing in Karakorum while Kublai himself was participating in the Chinese Campaign. Having the Goryeo crown prince come before him to concede after decades of fighting, Kublai Khan was jubilant and said "Goryeo is a country that long ago even Tang Taizong personally campaigned against but was unable to defeat. But now, its crown prince has come before me, and this be the will of heaven as it is!"

== Reign ==
He ascended the throne with the help of Kublai Khan. During his reign, Goryeo became a vassal of the Mongol-founded Yuan dynasty in China.

In 1269, the military leader Im Yon engineered a coup d'état to remove Wonjong. Kublai Khan dispatched 3,000 troops to oust the forces of the rebel. Wonjong visited the imperial court in 1271 after his re-accession.

Wonjong was the eldest son of the previous king, Gojong.

== Family ==
- Father: Gojong of Goryeo
  - Grandfather: Gangjong of Goryeo
  - Grandmother: Queen Wondeok of the Kaeseong Wang clan
- Mother: Queen Anhye of the Yu clan
  - Grandfather: Huijong of Goryeo
  - Grandmother: Queen Seongpyeong of the Jangheung Im clan
- Consorts and their Respective issue(s):
1. Queen Jeongsun of the Gyeongju Kim clan
  1. Crown Prince Wang Geo, 1st son
  2. 1st daughter
2. Princess Gyeongchang of the Yu clan, seventh cousin once removed.
  1. Wang Yi, Marquess Siyang, 2nd son
  2. Wang Jong, Marquess Sunan, 3rd son
  3. Princess Gyeongan, 2nd daughter
  4. Princess Hamnyeong, 3rd daughter
3. Unknown, from a Palace maid (궁인)
  1. Wang Ik-jang (왕익장), 4th son

== See also ==
- List of Korean monarchs
- List of Goryeo people
- Goryeo
- Mongol invasions of Korea
- Korea under Yuan rule

Wonjong of Goryeo House of Wang Born: 5 April 1219 Died: 23 July 1274
Regnal titles
Preceded by Gojong	King of Goryeo; 1260–1269	Succeeded by Yeongjong
Preceded by Yeongjong	King of Goryeo; 1269–1274	Succeeded by Chungnyeol
