= Chungseon of Goryeo =

King of Goryeo (1298, 1308–1313)

Chungseon 충선왕 忠宣王

King of Goryeo 1st reign
- Reign: 1298–1298
- Coronation: 1298
- Predecessor: Chungnyeol of Goryeo
- Successor: Chungnyeol of Goryeo

King of Goryeo 2nd reign
- Reign: 1308–1313
- Coronation: 1308
- Predecessor: Chungnyeol of Goryeo
- Successor: Chungsuk of Goryeo

Prince of Shen
- Reign: 1308–1316
- Coronation: 1308
- Successor: Wang Ko
- Born: 20 October 1275; Sapan Palace, Gaegyeong, Goryeo
- Died: 23 June 1325 (aged 49); Yeongyeong Mansion, Khanbaliq, Yuan Empire
- Burial: Deokneung (덕릉; 德陵)
- Consort: Princess Gyeguk (m. 1296; died 1316)
- Issue: Chungsuk of Goryeo; Prince Deokheung
Names
- Goryeo: Wang Won (왕원; 王謜), later Wang Chang (왕장; 王璋); Yuan: Ijir Bukhqa (이지르부카/익지례보화, 益知禮普花)
Posthumous name
- Great King Seonhyo (선효대왕, 宣孝大王; given by Goryeo dynasty); King Chungseon (충선왕, 忠宣王; given by Yuan dynasty)
- House: Wang
- Dynasty: Goryeo
- Father: Chungnyeol of Goryeo
- Mother: Queen Jangmok
- Religion: Buddhism

Korean name
- Hangul: 왕장
- Hanja: 王璋
- RR: Wang Jang
- MR: Wang Chang

Monarch name
- Hangul: 충선왕
- Hanja: 忠宣王
- RR: Chungseonwang
- MR: Ch'ungsŏnwang

Courtesy name
- Hangul: 중앙
- Hanja: 仲昻
- RR: Jungang
- MR: Chungang

Former name
- Hangul: 왕원
- Hanja: 王謜
- RR: Wang Won
- MR: Wang Wŏn

Chungseon (20 October 1275 – 23 June 1325), born Wang Wŏn (Korean: 왕원; Hanja: 王謜), later changed his name to Wang Chang (왕장; 王璋), also known by his Mongolian name Ijir Bukhqa (益知禮普花), was the 26th ruler of the Goryeo dynasty of Korea. He reigned in 1298, and again from 1308 to 1313.

Adept at calligraphy and painting, rather than politics, he generally preferred the life in Dadu (the capital of the Yuan dynasty, present-day Beijing) to that in Gaegyeong (the capital of Goryeo, present-day Kaesong). He was the eldest son of King Chungnyeol and Queen Jangmok; since Wonjong of Goryeo requested to marry his son to a daughter of the Khan in 1269, which Kubilai obliged with the youngest one of his daughters. This made King Chungseon the first Goryeo monarch with Mongolian ancestry.

== Biography ==
In 1277, King Chungseon was confirmed as Crown Prince; the following year he travelled to China and received his Mongolian name.

In 1296, he married Borjigin Budashiri, a Yuan princess and great-granddaughter of Kublai Khan. However, he already had three Korean wives, who were daughters of the powerful nobles.

King Chungseon's mother died in 1297, and this was followed by a violent purge brought on by allegations that she had been murdered. Perhaps upset by these events, King Chungnyeol petitioned Yuan to abdicate the throne and was accordingly replaced by his son in 1298. Faced with intense plotting between the faction of his Mongol Queen and his Korean wife, Royal Consort Jo of the Pungyang Jo clan, King Chungseon returned the throne to his father shortly thereafter.

As the grandson of Kublai Khan, Chungseon had significant sway in the Kuriltais of the early 14th century gathered to elect the new Khan. When Temür Khan's death spurred a competition to the throne, his wife Bulugan put Ananda as successor. Ayurbarwada, who was put to exile, rebelled with his brother Khayishan. King Chungseon who was their cousin, was intimate with them since his days in China, supported them. He supported Khayishan (Külüg Khan) to the throne in 1307, and supported Ayurbarwada (Buyantu Khan) to the throne in 1311. Thus he sat 7th in hierarchy in the empire after the sons of the Khan in their Kurultai.

Külüg Khan thanked his efforts by giving him a new title on top of his kingship of Goryeo, the Prince/King of Shenyang, (Note: In English, the title wang (王) can be translated as both "prince" (秦王 or Prince of Qin, Emperor Taizong of Tang's title until Xuanwu Gate Incident) and "king" (魏王 or King of Wei, Cao Cao's title at the time of his death).) (Note: 瀋陽王 (Simplified Chinese: 沈阳王, Pinyin: Shěnyáng Wáng; Korean: 심양왕; MR: Simyangwang).) in 1307 or 1308 specifically mentioned as thanks to his efforts of bringing the Khan to power. After his father's death in 1308, King Chungseon obliged to return to the throne of Goryeo and made efforts to reform court politics, but spent as much time as possible in China. In 1310, his Chinese title was changed to Prince/King of Shen. (Note: 瀋王 (Simplified Chinese: 沈王, Pinyin: Shěn Wáng; Korean: 심왕; MR: Simwang).) He is a very rare case of personal unions in East Asia.

He retired from the throne in 1313, and was replaced by his son, Wang Do. After the death of Buyantu Khan (Renzong of Yuan 元仁宗) in 1320, King Chungseon was briefly sent into exile to Tibet (lately Sakya) by the new Khan, but was permitted to return to Khanbaliq soon thereafter, where he died in 1325.

== Family ==
- Father: Chungnyeol of Goryeo
  - Grandfather: Wonjong of Goryeo
  - Grandmother: Queen Jeongsun of the Jeonju Kim clan
- Mother: Queen Jangmok of the Yuan Borjigin clan
  - Grandfather: Kublai Khan of Yuan
  - Grandmother: Chabi Khatun of Yuan
- Consorts and their Respective Issue(s):
1. Princess Supreme of Gye State of the Yuan Borjigin clan, personal name Budashiri – No issue.
2. Royal Consort Ui, personal name Yasokjin.
  1. Wang Gam, Prince Gwangneung, 1st son
  2. Wang Man, Chungsuk of Goryeo, 2nd son
3. Royal Consort Jeong of the Kaeseong Wang clan – No issue.
4. Royal Consort Jo of the Pungyang Jo clan – No issue.
5. Primary Consort Sunhwa of the Namyang Hong clan – No issue.
6. Royal Consort Sun of the Yangcheon Heo clan – No issue.
7. Royal Consort Suk of the Eonyang Kim clan– No issue.
8. Unknown
  1. Wang Hye, Prince Deokheung, 3rd son
  2. Princess Suchun, 1st daughter

== Ancestry ==
Ancestors of Chungseon of Goryeo

16. Gangjong of Goryeo
8. King Gojong of Goryeo
17. Queen Wondeok of the Yu clan
4. King Wonjong of Goryeo
18. King Huijong of Goryeo
9. Queen Anhye of the Yu clan
19. Queen Seongpyeong of the Jangheung Im clan
2. King Chungnyeol of Goryeo
20. Kim T'ae-sŏ
10. Kim Yak-sŏn
21. Lady Min
5. Queen Jeongsun of the Gyeongju Kim clan
22. C'hoe U
11. Lady Ch'oe
23. Grand Lady Byeon of the Hadong Jeong clan
1. King Chungseon of Goryeo
24. Genghis Khan (=30)
12. Tolui Khan
25. Börte Ujin (=31)
6. Kublai Khan
26. Jakha Gambhu
13. Sorghaghtani Beki
27. Wasai
3. Borjigin Qutugh Kelmysh
28. Alchi
14. Chigu Noyan of Khongirad
29. Princess Jining
7. Chabi Khatun
30. Genghis Khan (=24)
15. Tümelün behi
31. Börte Ujin (=25)

== Popular culture ==
- Portrayed by Moon Woo-jin, Nam Da-reum and Im Si-wan in the 2017 MBC TV series The King in Love.

== See also ==
- List of Korean monarchs
- Goryeo under Mongol rule

== Notes ==
Chungseon of Goryeo House of Wang Born: 20 October 1275 Died: 23 June 1325
Regnal titles
Preceded by King Chungnyeol	King of Goryeo; 1298	Succeeded by King Chungnyeol
Preceded by King Chungnyeol	King of Goryeo; 1308–1313	Succeeded by King Chungsuk
Chinese royalty
New creation	Prince of Shenyang c. 1308 – 1310	Succeeded by Himself as Prince of Shen
Preceded by Himself as Prince of Shenyang	Prince of Shen; 1310–1316	Succeeded by Wang Ko
