= Chungnyeol of Goryeo =

King of Goryeo from 1274 to 1308

Chungnyeol 충렬왕 忠烈王

King of Goryeo 1st reign
- Reign: 1274–1298
- Coronation: 1274
- Predecessor: Wonjong of Goryeo
- Successor: Chungseon of Goryeo

King of Goryeo 2nd reign
- Reign: 1298–1308
- Coronation: 1298
- Predecessor: Chungseon of Goryeo
- Successor: Chungseon of Goryeo

King Emeritus of Goryeo
- Reign: 1298–1298
- Coronation: 1298
- Predecessor: King Emeritus Wang Jeon
- Successor: Position abolished
- Born: 3 April 1236; Palace Part in Ganghwa-do, Goryeo
- Died: 30 July 1308 (aged 72); Sinhyo Temple, Gaegyeong, Goryeo
- Burial: Gyeongneung (경릉; 慶陵)
- Consort: Queen Jangmok (m. 1274; died 1297) Princess Jeongsin (m. 1260–1308)
- Issue: Chungseon of Goryeo
Regnal name
- King of the Prince State (부마국왕; 駙馬國王); King Il of Su (일수왕; 逸壽王)
Posthumous name
- Great King Gwangmun Seondeok Gyeonghyo (광문선덕경효대왕, 光文宣德景孝大王; given by Goryeo dynasty); King Chungnyeol (충렬왕, 忠烈王; given by Yuan dynasty)
- House: Wang
- Dynasty: Goryeo
- Father: Wonjong of Goryeo
- Mother: Queen Jeongsun
- Religion: Buddhism

Korean name
- Hangul: 왕거
- Hanja: 王昛
- RR: Wang Geo
- MR: Wang Kŏ

Monarch name
- Hangul: 충렬왕
- Hanja: 忠烈王
- RR: Chungnyeorwang
- MR: Ch'ungnyŏrwang

Chungnyeol (3 April 1236 – 30 July 1308), personal name Wang Kŏ, was the 25th king of Korea's Goryeo dynasty from 1274 to 1308. He was the son of Wonjong, his predecessor on the throne. Chungnyeol was king during the Mongol Invasions of Japan, aiding in the offensives.

== Biography ==
King Chungnyeol was the first Goryeo ruler to be remembered by the title wang (王), meaning "king". Previous rulers had received temple names with the suffix jo (祖) or jong (宗), meaning "revered ancestor" and a title typically reserved for emperors. After Goryeo became a vassal of the Mongol-led Yuan dynasty, the Yuan emperor Kublai Khan perceived this practice as lowering his own power and ordered that the Goryeo rulers could not receive such names henceforth.

King Chungnyeol, who became the Crown Prince Sim(諶) in 1260, proposed to marry a daughter of Kublai Khan in 1271, which Kublai Khan agreed. Since then, for more than 80 years, Goryeo kings married members of Mongol royalty. Heirs to the throne were given Mongol names and were sent to Dadu where they were raised until they reached adulthood.

== Reign ==
=== The Khan's son-in-law ===
After Wonjong's death in 1274, Wang Kŏ (Chungnyeol) rose to power as the 25th King of Goryeo. He was the first Goryeo king with the degraded title forced upon by the Mongols according to Goryeo's submission to vassal status after its 28 years of fierce resistance against the Mongol Empire. As King Chungnyeol became the son-in-law of Kublai Khan and Goryeo the vassal of the Yuan Dynasty, political interference by Yuan Dynasty furthered on towards Goryeo court. Despite these conditions, King Chungnyeol endeavored to maintain national independence and strengthen autonomy guaranteed by Kublai. One of his achievements was having territories like Dongnyeong and Tamna Prefectures lost during the war against the Mongols returned through negotiations. Also, he made it clear to the Yuan Dynasty of which Goryeo will be exercising the rights to keep its traditions and customs in accordance to the promises made twenty years ago by Kublai himself to Wonjong after submission. King Chungnyeol visited the Yuan Dynasty again in 1278, to have the Mongols withdraw its darughachis and troops stationed in Goryeo on the pretext of Kublai's promise 20 years ago. Troops or officials from the Yuan Dynasty were no longer stationed in Goryeo in the aftermath. These rights and requests enabled were partially attributed to the fact that Korean kings were the Khans' son-in-law with Mongolian princesses as their queens. The Korean kings during times of Yuan influence also had the authority to attend the Kuriltai of the Mongol Empire as titled rulers of Korea and Shenyang (고려심왕; 高麗瀋王). Even revered darugachis from the Yuan Dynasty could not act carelessly in front of Goryeo kings having to bow in front of them and receive a drink to pay their respects.

King Chungnyeol during his reign made attempts to make reforms by reestablishing monitoring institutions such as the Censorate of Household and Land Inspection (전민변정도감; 田民辨整都監) that focused on confiscating illegal properties under corrupt nobles whilst at the same time promoting the development of Confucian studies inside the nation. He also made various efforts to attempt to maintain the independence of Goryeo from Mongol domination. Confucian temples, known as in Korean as munmyo (문묘; 文廟), that paid homage to Confucius were built in Korea under his reign. Confucian educational centers such as the Sunkyungam, the predecessor of Sungkyunkwan, were also founded with scholarship foundations proposed by the renowned Confucian scholar An Hyang.

=== Mongol Invasions of Japan (1274–1281) ===
When Kublai Khan decided to execute the plan of invading the Kamakura Shogunate of Japan after having their emissaries deliberately ignored or killed by the Japanese, the role of constructing the enormous fleets (along with sending troops) for transport were befallen upon the Koreans of Goryeo. It was a huge expense, but Chungnyeol nor the Goryeo government could oppose the Khan's 'subsequent request which was rather enforced albeit their opposition. Goryeo eventually suffered great economically due to preparations for the expedition to Japan, and the livelihoods of the people were devastated by the requisition of war supplies. Horse farms set up to raise war horses for the expedition amounted in Jeju Island during these times. It was King Chungnyeol that selected the famed Kim Pang-gyŏng (김방경; 金方慶), a descendant of both Goryeo and Silla royalty, that stood out in the campaign as one of the few competent generals of the Mongol-led expedition.

=== Kadaan's Invasion of Korea (1290–1291) ===
In 1290, Kadaan (카다안; 哈丹), a former Mongolian general and rebel of the Yuan Dynasty stationed in Manchuria, invaded Goryeo after his defeat against the Yuan forces led by Naimandai (내만대; 乃蠻帶). Despite dire situations regarding Kadaan's rebels advancing further into Goryeo territory and the local troops' inability to fend the invaders due to Yuan's forceful disarmament, Chungryeol was said to spoil himself and his followers with extravagant royal banquets; maintaining an indifferent stance towards the invasion. King Chungnyeol, who neglected the situation and wasted national treasury consistently with an irresponsible demeanor, was even criticized by the Mongolian general Naimandai who came to assist the Korean forces fighting Kadaan's rebels. Korean defenses proved effective later on upon achieving decisive victories at Chi'ak Fortress (치악성; 雉岳城, Modern-day Wonju) and Yeongi (연기; 燕岐, Modern-day Sejong City), later strengthened by the assistance of the ten-thousand Yuan troops led by Naimandai. Nonetheless, many Korean locals were killed by the Kadaan-led rebels who were scavenging for food and supplies as a result.

=== Deprived of Power ===
After royal authority was strengthened by utilizing the powers of close aides, Chungnyeong continued to spoil himself by enjoying feasts and falconry. Then, with the returning of Crown Prince (King Chungseon) and Princess Gyeguk from Mongolia in 1297, he expressed his intention to cede the throne to his son Chang (King Chungseon) in 1298 and eventually stepped down. However, political strife stemming from opposition towards Chungseon's reform policy and the royal family's adulterous affairs led to political factions plotting between each other. He was eventually reinstated after eight months. In 1306, King Chungnyeol plotted against his son, the Crown Prince, with aims of preventing his reinstatement by having them divorced since Goryeo kings at the time could only rise to power under the condition of marrying a Mongolian Princess. However, the Crown Prince's quick response to the king's plot along with the abscession of Külüg Khan, the brother of the Prince's wife, neutralized such attempts made by Chungnyeong. The Crown Prince was eventually crowned in 1307 as King Chungseon, with Chungnyeol having been detained at a temple in Dadu. He eventually returned to Goryeo with all political power deprived.

=== Death ===
After a crushing defeat in the political dispute with his own son and returning to Goryeo, King Chungnyeol lost his will to politics and died at the age of 73 in Shinhyo Temple in July 1308, spending his final days hunting and drinking. He was said to have deep regrets regarding how the nation was left devastated and the political dispute causing discord between family members of the Royal House.

== Family ==
- Father: Wonjong of Goryeo
  - Grandfather: Gojong of Goryeo
  - Grandmother: Queen Anhye of the Yu clan
- Mother: Queen Jeongsun of the Jeonju Kim clan
  - Grandfather: Kim Yak-sŏn
  - Grandmother: Lady, of the Ubong Choe clan
- Consorts and their Respective Issue(s):
1. Queen Jangmok of the Yuan Borjigin clan, personal name Qutlugh Kelmysh.
  1. Crown Prince Wang Jang, 3rd son
  2. 3rd daughter (b. 1277)
  3. 4th son (b. 1278)
2. Princess Jeonghwa of the Kaesong Wang clan, third cousin once removed.
  1. Wang Cha, Duke Gangyang, 2nd son
  2. Lady Jeongnyeong (정녕원비/궁주), 1st daughter
  3. Lady Myeongsun (명순원비), 2nd daughter
3. Primary Consort Sukchang of the Eonyang Kim clan – No issue.
4. Ban-Ju (시비 반주)
  1. Wang Seo (왕서), 1st son
5. Royal Consort Mu of the Taein Si clan (무비 시씨) – No issue.
6. Concubine Kim (후궁 김씨) – No issue.

== In popular culture ==
- Portrayed by Jin Won in the 2012 MBC TV series God of War.
- Portrayed by Jeong Bo-seok in the 2017 MBC TV series The King in Love.

== See also ==
- Korea under Yuan rule

Chungnyeol of Goryeo House of Wang Born: 3 April 1236 Died: 30 July 1308
Regnal titles
Preceded by King Wonjong	King of Goryeo; 1274–1308	Succeeded by King Chungseon
