= Princess Jangnyeong =

Goryeo princess (fl. 14th century)

- Princess of Goryeo
- Died: ? Goryeo
- Spouse: King No of Yuan
- House: House of Wang (by birth)
- Father: Chunghye of Goryeo
- Mother: Princess Deoknyeong of the Yuan Borjigin clan

Princess Jangnyeong (Korean: 장녕공주 or 장녕옹주; Hanja: 長寧公主 or 長寧翁主) was a Goryeo Royal Princess as the only daughter of King Chunghye and Princess Deoknyeong, also the full sister of King Chungmok.

== Biography ==
Princess Jangnyeong married King No, but after the fall of Yuan dynasty, he disappeared in Bukpyeong. Having heard about this, her uncle, King Gongmin ordered Seong Jun-deuk (성준득) to search and find her. Later, in April 1370, Emperor Hongwu visited her in Beijing, treated her carefully and sent her back to Goryeo again. After arriving in Goryeo, she initially lived in a little village, but when her uncle knew about it, he then ordered her to lived in her mother's own mansion. The king treated his niece with hospitality and took care of everything she needed. She had no any issue with King No.

== Family ==
- Father: Wang Jeong, King Chunghye (충혜왕 왕정; 22 February 1315 – 30 January 1344)
  - Grandfather: Wang Man, King Chungsuk (충숙왕 왕만; 30 July 1294 – 3 May 1339)
  - Grandmother: Queen Gongwon of the Namyang Hong clan (공원왕후 홍씨; 25 August 1298 – 12 February 1380)
- Mother: Irenchenppan, Princess Deoknyeong of the Yuan Borjigin clan (이렌첸빤 덕녕공주 보르지긴씨; d. 15 April 1375)
  - Grandfather: Chopal (초팔)
    - Brother: Wang Heun, King Chungmok (충목왕 왕흔; 15 May 1337 – 25 December 1348)
- Husband: King No of Yuan (원나라 노왕; 魯王)
