= Goryeo under Mongol rule =

1270–1356 Goryeo vassalage to Yuan

Goryeo under Mongol rule Branch Secretariat for Eastern Campaigns 征東等處行中書省 정동등처행중서성
- Vassal of the Mongol Empire and the Yuan dynasty
- 1270–1356
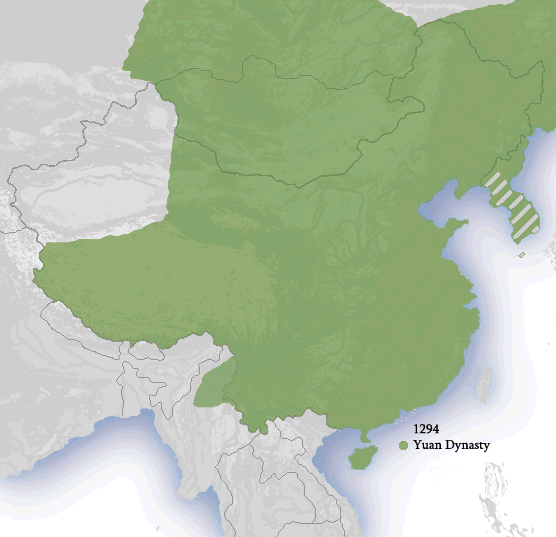
- The client state Goryeo in modern Korea within the Yuan Dynasty, circa 1294.
- Capital: Gaegyeong
- Government
  - Type: Monarchy, client kingdom, branch secretariat, province
- Emperor
  - 1270–1294: Shizu
  - 1294–1307: Chengzong
  - 1311–1320: Renzong
  - 1333–1356: Huizong
- King
  - 1270–1274: Wonjong
  - 1274–1308: Chungnyeol
  - 1308–1313: Chungseon
  - 1313–1330; 1332–1339: Chungsuk
  - 1330–1332; 1339–1344: Chunghye
  - 1351–1356: Gongmin
- History
  - Mongol invasions of Korea: 1231–1259
  - Established: 1270
  - Mongol invasions of Japan: 1274, 1281
  - Disestablished: 1356
Preceded by	Succeeded by
Goryeo	Goryeo
- Today part of: North Korea; South Korea

From about 1270 to 1356, the Korean kingdom of Goryeo was ruled by the Mongol Empire and the Mongol-led Yuan dynasty. After the Mongol invasions of Korea and the capitulation of Goryeo in the 13th century, Goryeo became a semi-autonomous vassal state and compulsory ally of the Yuan dynasty for about 80 years. It has been referred to as a "son-in-law kingdom in the Mongol Empire." The ruling line of Goryeo, the House of Wang, was permitted to rule Korea as a vassal of the Yuan, which established the Branch Secretariat for Eastern Campaigns (征東行省) in Korea as an extension of Mongol supervision and political power. Members of the Goryeo royal family were taken to Khanbaliq, and typically married to spouses from the Yuan imperial clan, the House of Borjigin. As a result, princes who became monarchs of Goryeo during this period were effectively imperial sons in-law (khuregen). Yuan overlordship ended in the 1350s when the Yuan dynasty itself started to crumble and King Gongmin of Goryeo began to push the Yuan garrisons back.

== History ==
=== Mongol invasions ===
The Mongol Empire first made contact with the Korean kingdom of Goryeo when they killed a Goryeo envoy to the Jin dynasty in 1211. In 1216, a host of Khitans fleeing the Mongols crossed into Goryeo. A Mongol-Jurchen army arrived on Goryeo's borders two years later chasing after the enemy Khitans. After defeating the Khitans with the help of Goryeo, the Mongol army left behind dozens of overseers to learn the Korean language. From 1219 to 1224, the Mongols sent envoys to collect tribute from Goryeo. In 1225, a Mongol envoy was killed under uncertain circumstances while returning from a tribute collecting mission. The Goryeo officials blamed the murder on a bandit but the Mongols believed that the Goryeo government was responsible. Moreover, the Mongols were displeased with Goryeo's refusal to contribute military forces for the Mongol campaign against the Eastern Jurchens. They launched several invasions against Goryeo from 1231 to 1259. There were six major campaigns: 1231, 1232, 1235, 1238, 1247, 1253; between 1253 and 1258, the Mongols under Möngke Khan's general Jalairtai Qorchi launched four devastating invasions in the final successful campaign against Korea, at tremendous cost to civilian lives throughout the Korean Peninsula. The Mongols annexed the northern areas of the Korean Peninsula and incorporated them into their empire as Ssangseong Prefecture and Dongnyeong Prefecture.

Ögedei Khan dispatched Sartaq against Goryeo and after they ravaged the Korean countryside, Goryeo accepted the placement of overseers known as darughachi within its borders. At the time, Goryeo was ruled by a military regime led by Ch'oe U (r. 1219–1249). The Ch'oe family had seized power from the king in the late 12th century. Despite retaining the king on the throne and the existing administrative structures, the Ch'oe family was usually the ones determining policy. In June 1232, Ch'oe U moved the court from Gaegyeong to the more defensible Ganghwa Island and murdered all the darughachi overseers. Ch'oe was willing to send tribute but refused to accept overseers, send royal hostages, or return the court to Gaegyeong. Further campaigns against Goryeo by the Mongols were undertaken by Tanggud (1253–1254), Ebügen (1247–1248), Prince Yekü (1253–1254), and Jalairtai (1254–1255). Goryeo quickly discovered that pitched battles usually led to defeat and instead retreated into the mountain fortresses and islands where they could more effectively defend their positions with their greater understanding of local geography. In 1241, Goryeo sent Wang Sun (1224–1283), a distant relative of the royal family posing as the crown prince, as hostage to the Mongols. Devastation from the Mongol raids caused the peasants to defect to the Mongols, who established Ssangseong Prefecture with the aid of local officials.

=== End of the war ===
Goryeo held out against the Mongol invasions for about thirty years. Eventually, due to increasing pressure and instability from repeated devastation caused by the Mongol invasions, the Ch'oe family was ousted from power. In May 1258, Ch'oe Ui (last head of the Ch'oe family) was assassinated by Kim Chun, ending the Ch'oe military regime and returning the king to power. For the next ten months, the new government debated on how to handle the Mongol invasions, with the majority favoring a settlement agreement. In May 1259, the crown prince Wang Chŏn was sent as a hostage to the Mongol court where he agreed to destroy Ganghwa's fortifications and return the capital to the mainland. Upon receiving news that his father had died, Wang Chŏn was sent back to Goryeo where he was enthroned as king (posthumously Wonjong of Goryeo) in June 1260. Shortly after, he received a number of edicts from Kublai Khan insisting again on the return of the capital to the mainland, but also agreeing to release thousands of Goryeo captives and that Goryeo may keep their traditional clothing. The latter command was later interpreted as an overarching directive to preserve Goryeo's institutions such as slavery and land tenure practices.

Wonjong's government led by Kim Chun was overthrown by Im Yŏn in 1269. In response, the Mongols backed the rebellion of another group of Goryeo officials in the northwest and created the Dongnyeong Prefecture. Another invasion was prepared in 1270. In an event known as the Sambyeolcho Rebellion, the Three Patrols army (sambyeolcho) that served Goryeo's government rebelled against the Im family, overthrew them, and moved the officials back to Gaegyeong from Ganghwa. They fled to Jindo Island and then Jeju Island, where they remained until 1273 when Goryeo forces arrived and defeated them, after which a part of the island was converted to a breeding ground for the Yuan royal herd. Goryeo regained formal control of Dongnyeong in 1290 and Jeju in 1294. However the military command (Tumen) on Jeju (Tamna Prefectures) remained outside of their jurisdiction.

Due to the turmoil caused by the Mongol invasions, a number of Koreans from northern Goryeo entered China either as captives or willingly to seek their fortunes elsewhere, especially in the Yuan capitals of Khanbaliq and Shangdu. Looser control from the Goryeo government resulted in the departure of farming families for Liaoyang and Shenyang to escape tax and labor services. Possibly as many as 250,000 Koreans lived in China during this period.

=== Mongol invasions of Japan ===
Militarily, following the 1259 peace treaty, Mongol ambitions on Japan resulted in two invasions of Japan. In both efforts, the Mongols directed Korean shipbuilding and militarization towards the amphibious assault of the Japanese coasts and pressed a large proportion of Korean naval and infantry forces into the service of Mongol military objectives. Korea supplied 770 fully manned ships and 5,000 soldiers in 1274 and 900 ships and 10,000 soldiers in 1281. During the preparations for the invasion of Japan, Kublai established two institutions to oversee affairs in Goryeo. An office for military agricultural colonies was created in 1271 and the Branch Office for Eastern Campaigns was created in 1280. The former office was abandoned soon after but the Branch Secretariat continued to function as a feature of Mongol-Goryeo administration for the next 70 years. Yuan officials and envoys took concubines and wives in Korea while they were stationed in Korea for the invasion of Japan. For a variety of reasons, both invasions failed. During the periods leading up to and during the invasions, Korea was effectively forced to serve as a Mongol military base. The Yuan dynasty paid for ships and soldiers in Goryeo with baochao paper money.

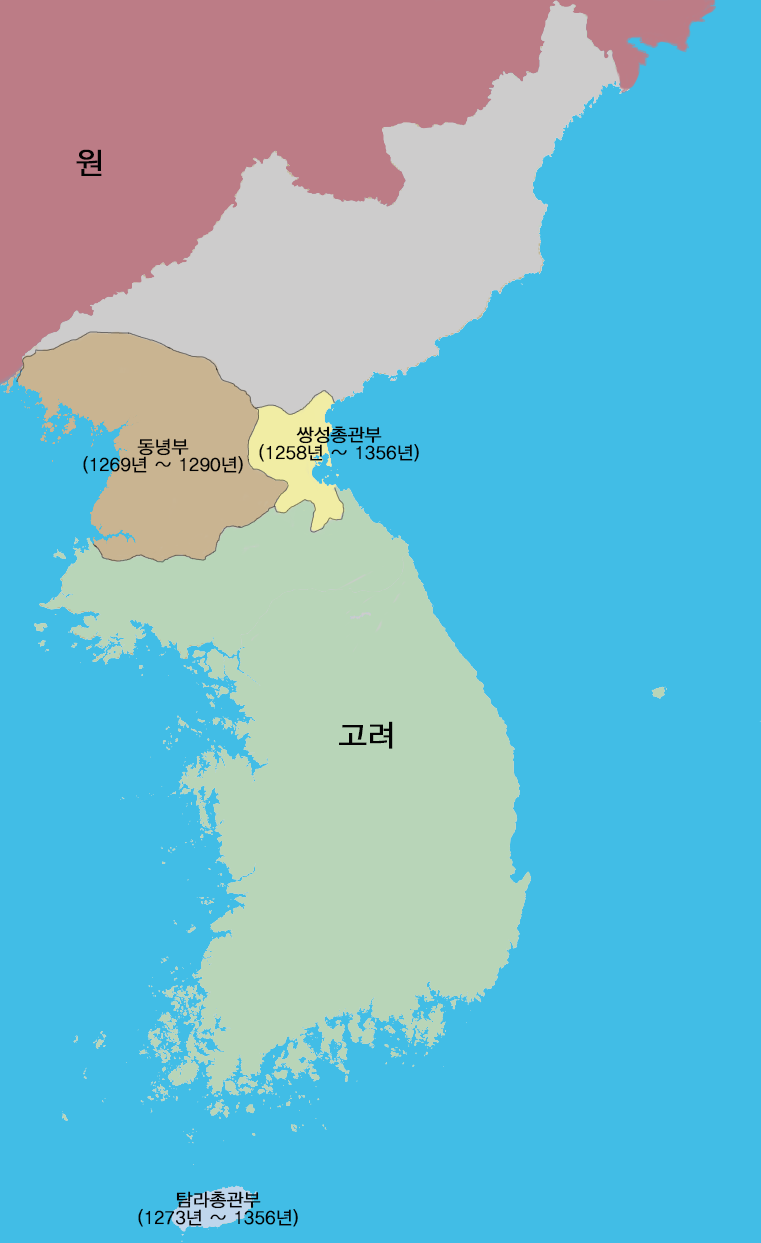
Ssangseong and Dongnyeong prefectures

=== Status ===
After 1270, Goryeo became a "fully integrated client kingdom," however official protocol was that of a subordinate principality. David M. Robinson described Goryeo's status as incorporated within the "Great Yuan ulus" but legally distinct from the rest of the empire. Yuan legal codes separated Goryeo from southern China. In the 1990s, some Korean scholars called the period of Mongol rule the age of "Yuan intervention". Rashid al-Din Hamadani described Goryeo as a province in name but a separate state within the Yuan dynasty. It has also been called a "son-in-law kingdom in the Mongol empire".

Starting with King Chungnyeol (r. 1274-1308), kings of Goryeo were married to Mongol Borjigid princesses and Goryeo princes were raised and educated at the Yuan court. Gongmin of Goryeo (r. 1351-1374) referred to Goryeo's relationship with the Genghisids as that between vassal and lord. Because of royal marriages with princesses of the Mongol Yuan royal family, Goryeo was considered unique among the states. The Genghisids had also established marriage alliances with other rulers and allies early on such as the Khongirads and Qocho Uyghurs, but in no other case except Goryeo did they both go to war and form a marriage alliance with later on. Consequently, Goryeo remained a bulwark of support for the Genghisids and was the last state in East Asia to recognize them as a legitimate polity in the 1380s.

In 1280, the Branch Secretariat for Eastern Campaigns was created, which lasted until the end of the dynasty. According to Christopher P. Atwood, the Goryeo prince served as the grand councilor (chengxiang) but the secretariat managers (pingzhang) were appointed by the Yuan court. According to David M. Robinson, it was the Goryeo king who was head of the Branch Secretariat. In 1300, Manager Körgüz proposed abolishing Goryeo court ritual and official hierarchy to better fit its status as a province, but this proposal was rejected. The Mongols established several autonomous commands in Korea that remained outside the control of the Goryeo court. However George Qingzhi Zhao states that the kings of Goryeo retained the autonomy to conduct their own government, including setting up bureaucratic structures, selecting officials, exercising laws and taxes, and using those taxes for Goryeo rather than sending them to the Yuan court.

The issue of Goryeo's status was raised again in 1302 and between 1309-1312. In both cases, the proposal to change Goryeo's status was raised by the Hong clan of Hong Ta-gu, who were Goryeo defectors with a long history of conflict with their homeland. The Hong clan was a warlord family that originated in northwestern Goryeo. They made contact with the Mongols in 1218 and defected to the Mongol Empire in 1231. As a former warlord family in Goryeo, the Hong clan specialized in military matters pertaining to Goryeo and made their name by participating in campaigns against their homeland, even stoking conflict on purpose to their benefit. In 1302, they proposed combining Liaoyang and the Branch Secretariat for Eastern Campaigns (Goryeo). Between 1309-1312, the sons of Hong Ta-gu proposed establishing a province in Goryeo instead of having a separate kingdom. This was because Chungseon of Goryeo held both the position of king of Goryeo and Wang of Shenyang. The Wang of Shenyang was created in 1260 to rule Goryeo people living in Shenyang. While real power resided in the Hong clan and other families, the symbolic power of the post occupied by the Goryeo royal family provided an alternative center of power among the Goryeo elites. In 1308, Külüg Khan granted the post to Chungseon. The emperor rejected the proposal to turn Goryeo into a province in 1312. The Hong clan lost most of its power and the brothers are not mentioned again after 1312.

Goryeo was lower ranked than Inner Asians who surrendered to the Mongols earlier. When the Mongols placed the Uighurs of the Kingdom of Qocho over the Koreans at the court the Korean King objected. The Mongol Emperor Kublai Khan said that the Uighur king of Qocho was ranked higher than the Karluk Kara-Khanid ruler, who in turn was ranked higher than the Korean King, who was ranked last among the three because the Uighurs surrendered to the Mongols first, the Karluks surrendered after the Uighurs, and the Koreans surrendered last, and that the Uighurs surrendered peacefully without violently resisting. Koreans were classified along with Northern Chinese, Khitan, Balhae and Jurchen people as "Han people."

Starting in 1271, the Goryeo royal family sent its boys to serve in the kheshig, the Great Khan's imperial bodyguard. Their service lasted from a few years to more than a decade. Their status as part of the kheshig granted them privileges in Goryeo such as legal immunity and the ability to appropriate government assets such as horse fodder or special gowns worn by the guards. In 1350, a Goryeo man named Choe Won who was part of the kheshig made demeaning comments about the Goryeo king Chungjeong. When he was taken in for interrogation by Goryeo authorities, Choe Won asserted his rights as part of the kheshig, refused to kneel, and left the premise. The Goryeo men serving in the kheshig were lumped in together with the northern and southern Chinese, who were sometimes subject to sumptuary restrictions that Goryeo protested. In 1315, an order was given to restrict extravagant clothing among the "northern Chinese, Goryeo men, and southern Chinese" in the kheshig that did not apply to Mongols. In 1345, Yi Jehyeon protested such restrictions when another similar order was given. He emphasized Goryeo's dedicated service to the Genghisids, military service rendered in putting down a Khitan rebellion, immediate recognition of Kublai as the Great Khan, marriage ties to the Genghisid princesses, and their service in the kheshig. The petition also noted that the Goryeo royal family members sat among the Khongirad with the "white nine", which might refer to the white clothing of esteemed people or the mare's milk that they drank.

=== Branch Secretariat for Eastern Campaigns ===
The Branch Secretariat for Eastern Campaigns was created in 1280 to mobilize Goryeo resources for the Mongol invasions of Japan. Its offices were located in Gaegyong and was nominally led by the king of Goryeo, who held the dual titles of Imperial Son-in-Law King of Goryeo and Minister of the Left of the Branch Secretariat for Eastern Campaigns. However even though it was largely staffed by Goryeo officials, it was directly subordinate to the Yuan throne, which stationed Chinese, Jurchens, and Mongols in many of the Branch Secretariat's key posts. After the end of the Japanese campaigns, the Branch Secretariat continued to function as an institution of Mongol political control in Goryeo, with King Chungnyeol of Goryeo being appointed as its head by Kublai Khan in 1288 with the expectation that he would contribute to the Mongol Civil War. To gain Kublai's acceptance and prevent further demands, Chungnyeol dressed in Mongol clothing, cut his hair in the Mongol fashion, and agreed to change the names of Goryeo's administrative bureaus to reflect their subordination to the Mongols. Chungnyeol's successor, Chungseon of Goryeo (Kublai's grandson), spent a good deal of his youth in the Yuan capital and saw himself as both the king of Goryeo and as a prince of the empire. He favored adopting the Yuan legal code and implementing reforms to reduce Goryeo's slave population, which elicited opposition from Goryeo elites who feared that such measures would erode Goryeo's sovereignty. They appealed to Kublai's order that Goryeo's "dynastic customs" be retained and argued that aligning with Yuan legal institutions contravened Kublai's will. As a result of such advocacy, fundamental changes to Goryeo's institutions were not made. Chungseon abdicated in 1313 after only five years on the throne and chose to live in the Yuan capital instead because he believed the Yuan court was the true center of power, and power in Goryeo ultimately came from successfully cultivating relations there.

In 1343, King Chunghye of Goryeo was dethroned after being arrested by Yuan envoys. Gi Cheol and Hong Bin were appointed to the Branch Secretariat's leadership by the Yuan until Chunghye's son, Wang Hŭn, had an audience with the Yuan emperor Toghon Temür, and was appointed king as well as head of the Branch Secretariat.

The darughachi were Mongolian resident commissioners sent to the Goryeo court. These commissioners, while nominally subordinate to the Goryeo king, were routinely supplied with provisions and were actively involved in the affairs of the Goryeo court.

Although the Branch Secretariat was used as a means of Mongol political control over Goryeo, Goryeo rulers also used the Branch Secretariat to advance their own claims on the Goryeo throne. The king's position as head of the Branch Secretariat enhanced his station within Goryeo as well as in the empire. Chungsuk of Goryeo lobbied Mongols, Koreans, and Chinese with ties to the Yuan court for support in regaining his throne from his son and promised them posts in the Branch Secretariat. Chungseon also benefited from three rest stop villages established by Kublai in 1279 between Goryeo and Khanbaliq that became his base for expansion into Liaoyang. He was granted lands on the northern bank of the Yalu and gained significant influence over the region.

The Branch Secretariat was responsible for administering imperial exams. Twenty-three Goryeo men passed the Yuan provincial examination at the Branch Secretariat between 1315 and 1353.

=== Aftermath ===
The Goryeo dynasty survived under the Yuan until King Gongmin began to push back the Mongolian garrisons of the Yuan in the 1350s, when the Yuan dynasty faced the Red Turban Rebellion in China. Empress Gi and her eunuch Bak Bulhwa attempted a major coup of Northern China and Goryeo. Goryeo incurred negative consequences as a result of the eunuch Bak Bulhwa's actions. Empress Gi intervened in Goryeo and her family contended with the Goryeo royal family; her family was purged by Gongmin of Goryeo in 1356. By 1356 Goryeo under King Gongmin regained its lost northern territories such as the Ssangseong Prefecture placed under the Liaoyang province by the Yuan. He also repulsed the Red Turban invasions of Goryeo in 1360. Empress Gi sent the Mongol army to invade Goryeo in 1364, but it failed. By 1370, Goryeo had terminated its tributary relationship with the Yuan and sent military forces to the border of the Ming dynasty in Liaodong.

However, even after the expulsion of the Yuan dynasty from China in 1368, some Goryeo kings such as U still favored the Yuan, still a formidable power in the Mongolian Plateau as the Northern Yuan, over the Ming dynasty established by Han people. After the assassination of King Gongmin in 1374, the newly enthroned King U's court was dominated by pro-Yuan families. Three years after King U's accession, Goryeo re-established its tributary status with the Yuan. In 1388, Goryeo sent an army to attack the Ming dynasty due to demands by the Ming to turn over territory in the north, but deputy commander Yi Seong-gye refused to carry out the invasion and instead turned back the army to remove the Goryeo king from power. In 1392, Yi Seong-gye, also known as Taejo of Joseon, officially founded the state of Joseon, cut off relations with the Mongols and sent tributary envoys to the Ming founder Emperor Hongwu for recognition.

== Marriage ==
=== Mongol princesses ===
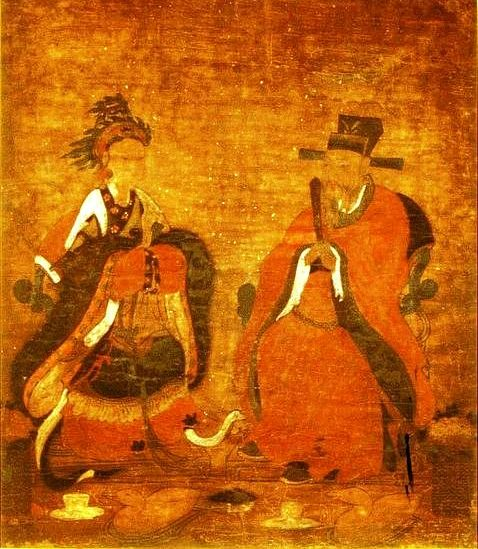
King Gongmin (1330–1374) and Princess Noguk assisted in the peaceful succession of Gegeen Khan.

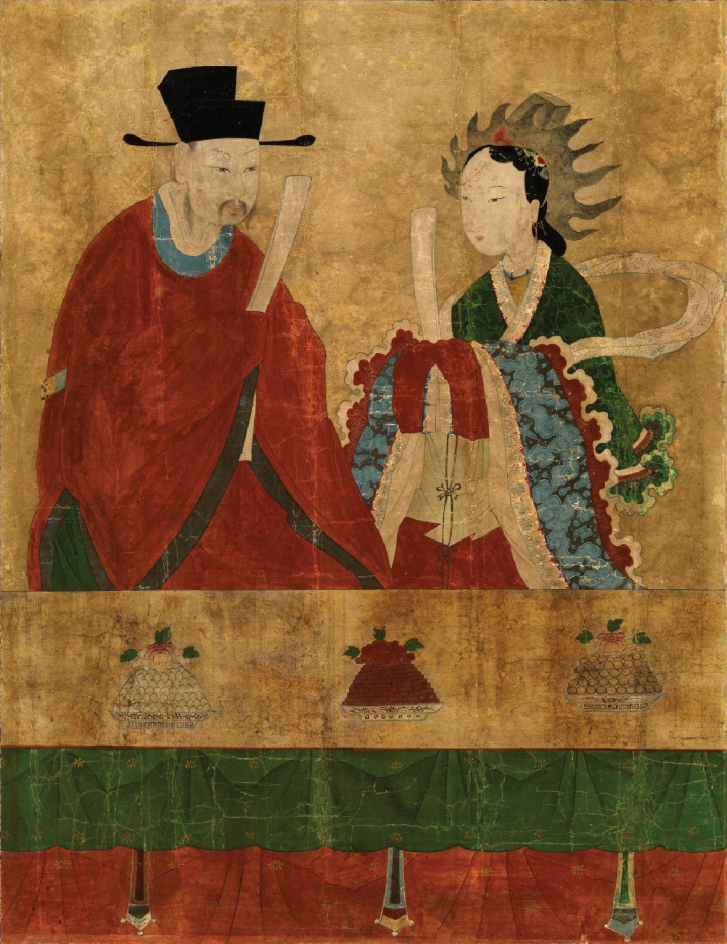
Portrait of King Gongmin and Princess Noguk, late 14th century

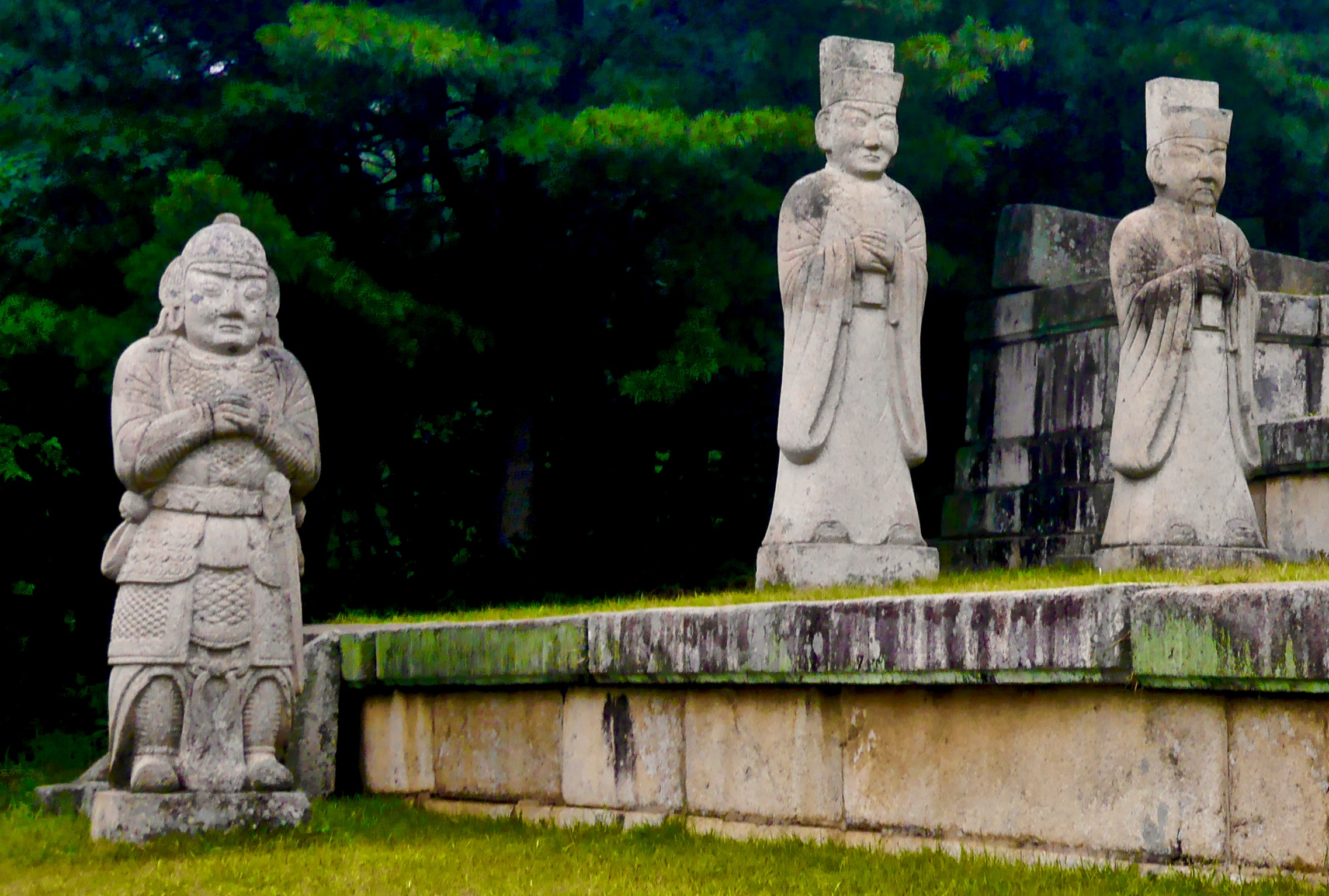
Statues of functionaries at the mausoleum of King Gongmin

Once the treaty was concluded and vassaldom established, intermarriage between the Koreans and Mongols was encouraged by the Mongol Empire. After the death of Wonjong in 1274, his successor Chungnyeol of Goryeo received Kublai's daughter Qutlugh-Kelmish as a wife, and his reign began a wholesale Mongolization of the Korean court that continued until the middle of the 14th century. On paper, the official protocol for Korea was that of a subordinate principality, and Korean rulers made lengthy stays at the Mongol Yuan court, both before and after their coronation. In addition, their Mongol wives, and even concubines, exerted great influence over Goryeo politics. For instance, Bayankhutag, Princess Gyeonghwa selected officials for posts within the Goryeo government. The Mongols and the Kingdom of Goryeo became linked via marriage and Goryeo became a quda (marriage alliance) state of the Yuan dynasty; monarchs of Goryeo during this period were effectively imperial sons in-law (khuregen). The effects of intermarriage on Mongol-Goryeo relations worked both ways: during the reign of Kublai Khan, King Chungnyeol of Goryeo married one of Kublai's daughters; later, a court lady from Korea called the Empress Gi became an empress through her marriage with Ukhaantu Khan, and her son, Biligtü Khan of the Northern Yuan dynasty, became a Mongol Khan. Furthermore, the kings of Goryeo held an important status within the Mongol imperial hierarchy, much like other important families of conquered or client states of the Mongol Empire (e.g. the Uyghurs, the Oirats, and Khongirad). Beginning with the marriage of Chungnyeol and Khudulugh Khaimish, a daughter of Kublai Khan, a total of eight princesses of the Yuan court married into the Goryeo royal family.

Chungnyeol (r. 1274–1298, 1298) married Qutlugh Kelmysh, the youngest daughter of Kublai and Chabi. The title given to her by the Yuan dynasty was Princess-Supreme of the State of Qi (Princess Jeguk in Korean). They had a son named Wang Wŏn who later became King Chungseon (r. 1298, 1309-1313). Although Chungnyeol already had a son with Princess Jeongshi named Wang Cha, because he was not born from a Mongol princess, he was not eligible to become heir to the Goryeo throne and was exiled to a temple in 1279. Chungseon married Botashirin, the Princess-Supreme of the State of Ji (Princess Gyeguk), but the two had a bad relationship. Chungseon refused to have sex with Botashirin and slept with other concubines, impregnating them. Botashirin would not have this so she sent messengers to the Yuan court asking them to pressure Chungseon into doing the deed. The Emperess Dowager of the Yuan sent an envoy to persuade Chungseon into doing his duty but he refused. Chungnyeol, who had abdicated to his son, tried to get the couple to improve their relationship, but when all efforts failed he petitioned to the Yuan court for Botashirin to be remarried to someone else out of fear that one her sexual liaisons would result in offspring. Due to the pre-eminence of the Genghisid royal lineage, he feared that such an offspring would take the Goryeo throne. As a result, the Yuan deposed Chungseon and reinstated Chungnyeol as king in the summer of 1298. Chungseon married another Mongol woman, Yasokjin, but she was not a princess and was simply called "a Mongol woman" by Korean historians. She was posthumously named "virtuous concubine" (Ui).

King Chungsuk (r. 1314-1338), the son of Chungseon and Yasokjin, married three Mongol princesses. The first was Irinjinbala, the Senior Princess of the State of Pu Ji (Princess Bokguk). They married in 1316 when Chungsuk was in China and left for Goryeo in the winter. Three years later Irinjinbala died under suspicious circumstances. The Yuan court sent envoys to Goryeo in 1321 to investigate the circumstances of her death. A servant girl and a cook for the princess were arrested. According to the cook, Chungsuk consorted with Consort Deok and Irinjinbala was jealous. Irinjinbala was beaten by Chungsuk on two separate occasions, the first time resulting in bleeding from the nose. Several Goryeo ministers wrote an appeal to the Yuan court charging the cook with making a false accusation. In 1324, the Yuan married Jintong, posthumously the Senior Princess of the State of Cao Ji (Princess Jokuk), to Chungsuk. She died at the age of 18 in 1325 after giving birth during a trip to Dragon Mountain (Yongsan) with Chungsuk. Chungsuk married Bayanhudu in 1333. Her lineage is uncertain and the Goryeosa simply calls her a "Mongol woman" but since she did have a royal title, she was almost certainly part of the royal family. According to Xiao Qiqing, she was the sister of Jintong. After Chungsuk died, she was raped by her stepson, Chunghye, and was prevented from escaping to the Yuan court. As a result of this incident as well as initiating reforms detrimental to Mongol interests, Yuan envoys arrested Chunghye in 1343 and exiled him to China but he died on the way.

Chunghye (r. 1330–1332, 1339–1343) married a Mongol princess named Irinjinbal, posthumously Princess Dening (Princess Deongnyeong) in 1330. She had two children. One was Wang Hŭn (also known as Basima Duorji) and the other was an unnamed daughter. When Chunghye was deposed in 1344, Toghon Temür ordered for Wang Hŭn (posthumously King Chungmok) to be put on the throne. The boy was only eight years old at the time, so real control over the Goryeo government remained in Irinjinbal's hands. He died four years later. The Yuan court continued to control the succession of Goryeo rulers and ordered Wang Jeo (also known as Misijian Duorzhi), the son of Chunghye and a concubine, to be put on the throne. Wang Jeo (posthumously King Chungjeong) was only 12 years old when he became king. Irinjinbal forced him to abdicate in 1351 and the Yuan ordered Wang Gi, the brother of Chunghye, to assume the throne. Wang Gi (posthumously King Gongmin) reigned from 1351 to 1374 during the time of Yuan collapse. He was the last Goryeo king to marry a Mongol princess.

King Gongmin (r. 1351-1374) married Botashirin, the Grand and Senior Princess of the State of Lu (Princess Noguk), at the Yuan court in 1349. Their marriage was described as happy. She was a devout Buddhist who did not bear children in the first nine years of her marriage and so she recommended other women to bear sons for Gongmin. During a palace coup, she guarded Gongmin outside his mother's bedroom while he hid under a blanket. Botashirin became pregnant in 1365 and died in childbirth. After her death, Gongmin stopped attending court for three days and ordered all government officials to wear mourning clothes. He held a lavish state funeral for Botashirin and personally led the officials in a memorial ceremony, specifying that it be accompanied by Mongol music.

Princesses of the Yuan Court Married into the Goryeo Court
Name	Title	Husband	Father
Khudulugh Khaimish	Princess-Supreme of State of Qi	Chungnyeol	Kublai Khan
Botashirin	Princess-Supreme of the State of Ji	Chungseon	Ganmala (son of Zhenjin)
Yesujin	Uibi (Good Imperial Concubine)	Chungseon	?
Irinjinbala	Senior Princess of the State of Pu Ji	Chungsuk	Esian-Temur (grandson of Kublai)
Jintong	Senior Princess of the State of Cao Ji	Chungsuk	Amuge (son of Darmabala)
Bayanhudu	Princess Qinghua	Chungsuk	Amuge
Nolun	Princess of ?	Chungseon	Songshan (Möngke Khan's son)
Irinjinbal	Princess Dening	Chunghye	Jiaoba
Botasirin	Grand and Senior Princess of the State of Lu	Gongmin	Amuge

=== Korean women ===
Korean women first entered the Mongol Empire as war booty. Later in the 13th century, Kublai and the Mongol elites started demanding women from elite Goryeo families as wives and consorts. Goryeo refused these demands but created an official government bureau in Goryeo for the organization of and flow of tribute women to the Mongol Empire. The Mongols also extracted other tributes such as gold, silver, cloth, grain, ginseng, and falcons from Goryeo. As with all parts of the Mongol Empire, Goryeo provided palace women, eunuchs, Buddhist monks, and other personnel to the Mongols. Sometimes women were given as royal gifts. The Goryeo king gave Kublai's Tibetan finance minister Sangha a Goryeo woman who was later seized as part of Sangha's assets when he was executed in 1291. Kublai then gave the woman to an Indian prince from Ma'bar residing in Quanzhou.

Yuan envoys regularly visited Goryeo to procure women in the name of the emperor, who distributed them to leading ministers on many occasions. Almost 1,500 Korean women were noted as tribute in Yuan and Goryeo documents but the number was likely greater if including personal maids and servants who accompanied the women and others who were undocumented. Another estimate gives a number of around 2,000 Korean tribute women. One concubine who entered the Yuan court, Empress Gi, was instrumental in the popularization of Korean clothing, food, and lifestyle in the capital through her political command and incorporation of Korean females and eunuchs in the court. According to one Chinese writer, during the mid-14th century, Goryeo culture had heavily influenced the Yuan dynasty's clothing. It became prestigious to marry Korean women among members of the Yuan elite. A Karluk poet named Nasen who had settled in Qingyuan traveled to Khanbaliq in 1355 and wrote a poem comparing the poor existence of Chinese villagers to the life of luxury a Korean woman experienced in the capital. Korean women became a source of criticism for some Chinese writers who used them to emphasize the moral depravity of Mongol figures in the Yuan court. However, despite the great social status and economic privilege that a few Korean women gained through their relations with high-ranking elites in the Yuan court, the majority served as palace attendants or servants in elite households and likely married locally.

Many educated men in Goryeo took issue with Korean women in the Mongol Empire. Writers like Yi Kok (1298-1351) and Yi Chehyŏn (1287-1367) saw them as a symbol of Goryeo's subjugation. In 1335, Yi Kok proposed an end to the collection of tribute women in Goryeo. He described grief-stricken parents who watched helplessly as Yuan envoys took their daughters.

Some Yuan-Goryeo marriages involved Korean women from elite families. The Goryeo royal family had daughters from two kings (Chunghye and Chungseon) and one royal clansman marry into the Genghisid family and to senior Yuan officials. A friend of Kublai's, the Kangly Turk Yanzhen, was given Kim Chang'a, a former palace attendant as a reward for meritorious service. His grandson, Berke Buqa, married a woman from an elite Goryeo family. The Goryeo court tried to appeal to his ties to Goryeo in order to win his support due to his high position at the Yuan court. Some Goryeo families and Yuan officials arranged marriages independently of the royal courts' directives.

== Military ==
Under Mongol rule, the northern defenses of Goryeo were reduced and the standing army was abolished. In their place, Goryeo relied on mobilizing men from the general populace on an ad hoc basis depending on military circumstances, while the Yuan-controlled Ssangseong Prefecture and Yuan forces north of the Yalu River became the true defense of Goryeo's northern border. The Palace Guard (Sukwigun) became known less for its martial prowess and more for its numerous profitable posts. Goryeo kings like Chungseon experimented with new military structures by emulating the Yuan military household system to provide military labor. By the mid-14th century, the Goryeo king's personal guards were modeled after the Mongol Kheshig with some prestigious posts given Mongol titles.

The Mongol military system known as the tumen, or myriarchy, based on units of 10,000 was introduced to Goryeo. The numerical strength of 10,000 was often nominal in nature and failed to reach that number. They were filled by Goryeo soldiers and led by Goryeo officers, representing a degree of autonomy from the Mongols. However the appointment of officers was effectively controlled by the Mongols throughout the mid-14th century and they reserved the right to call on Goryeo's military forces for their own campaigns.

When Chunghye was arrested by Yuan envoys in 1343, two Goryeo military commanders aided the Yuan in delivering the king to the Yuan court. Following the arrest, a number of Goryeo officers raided the homes of several powerful families, but it is uncertain whether this was opportunistic exploitation of the situation or if it was done on the emperor's orders.

== Culture ==
Mongol domination in both political and military life led to the adoption of Mongol cultural customs throughout Northeast Asia. Mongolian style clothing and hairstyles were well received among much of Goryeo's court. The Mongolian diet is also said to have had a deep impact on Korean cuisine. Mongol names, which were bestowed by the Yuan court for contributions rendered to the empire, began appearing in the Chinese and Korean populations. Korean culture such as clothing also became popular among the elites of Khanbaliq during the 13th and early 14th centuries through the import of Korean women. Probably as a result of imperial patronage and its associated prestige, Korean fashions spread into the Jiangnan region, and even some degree of Korean language competence was heard of among the guards.

Scholars from Goryeo traveled in China and to Khanbaliq, where they encountered strains of Neo-Confucian thought, which they took with them back to Goryeo. In 1314, Ayurbarwada Buyantu Khan donated 17,000 juan from the former Southern Song archives to Goryeo. In Khanbaliq and the Jiangnan region, Korean scholars studied Zhu Xi and prepared for the Yuan imperial examinations, while Chinese administrators assigned to Goryeo disseminated Neo-Confucian ideology as well.

== Economy ==
Yuan paper currency entered Goryeo's markets as gifts and payments for goods and services rendered. As a result, Yuan inflationary pressure also affected Goryeo through the royal family and the government elite with ties to Khanbaliq. The Goryeo royal family maintained several residences in the Yuan capital where they incurred expenses and took loans from merchants.

Sea routes connected Goryeo to Khanbaliq through the port of Zhigu in Shandong. In 1295, a Goryeo official sent 14,000 bolts of linen to Shandong, where the goods were transported to via land to Yidu. They were then exchanged for paper currency there for use by the heir apparent of Goryeo in Khanbaliq.

== See also ==
- History of Korea
- Mongol invasions of Japan
- Manchuria under Yuan rule
- Mongolia under Yuan rule
- Tibet under Yuan rule
- Yuan dynasty in Inner Asia
- Mongolians in South Korea

== Sources ==
- Atwood, Christopher P. (2004), Encyclopedia of Mongolia and the Mongol Empire, Facts On File
- Ebrey, Patricia Buckley; Walthall, Anne (2014), Pre-Modern East Asia: To 1800: A Cultural, Social, and Political History, Third Edition, Boston, MA: Wadsworth, Cengage Learning, ISBN 978-1-133-60651-2.
- Hatada, Takashi; Smith Jr, Warren W.; Hazard, Benjamin H. (1969), A History of Korea, Santa Barbara, CA: ABC-Clio, ISBN 0-87436-064-1.
- Hwang, Kyung Moon (2016), A History of Korea, Macmillan International Higher Education, ISBN 9781137573599
- Lee, Ji-Young (2017), China's Hegemony: Four Hundred Years of East Asian Domination, Columbia University Press
- Robinson, David M. (2009). Empire's Twilight: Northeast Asia Under the Mongols. Harvard University Press. p. 49. ISBN 9780674036086.
- Robinson, David M. (2022), Korea and the Fall of the Mongol Empire, Cambridge University Press
- Robinson, David M. (2023), "Koryo˘ in the Mongol Empire", The Cambridge History of the Mongol Empire, Cambridge University Press
- Rossabi, Morris (1994). "The reign of Khubilai Khan". In Twitchett, Dennis; Franke, Herbert (eds.). The Cambridge History of China, Volume 6: Alien Regimes and Border States, 907–1368. Cambridge: Cambridge University Press. pp. 414–489. ISBN 978-0-521-24331-5.
