= Huibi Yun =

Korean queen consort (1310–1380)

Royal Consort Hui 희비

Queen consort of Goryeo
- Tenure: ?–1344
- Predecessor: Princess Deoknyeong
- Successor: Queen Indeok
- Born: 1310; Goryeo
- Died: 1380 (aged 70); Goryeo
- Spouse: Chunghye of Goryeo (died 1344)
- Issue: Chungjeong of Goryeo
- House: Papyeong Yun (by birth); House of Wang (by marriage)
- Father: Yun Gye-jong
- Mother: Lady Min of the Yeoheung Min clan

Royal Consort Hui of the Papyeong Yun clan (Korean: 희비 윤씨; Hanja: 禧妃 尹氏; 1310–1380) was a Korean queen consort as the second wife of Chunghye of Goryeo and the mother of his successor, Chungjeong of Goryeo. She was the third Goryeo Queen consort who did not receive a Posthumous name like the other queen consorts following Lady Yi.

== Biography ==
=== Background ===
The future Consort Hui was born into the noble Papyeong Yun clan as the daughter of Yun Gye-jong (윤계종), son of Yun Bo (윤보) and Lady Min (민씨), daughter of Min Jeok (민적) from the Yeoheung Min clan. She had one older brother and one younger brother.

=== Palace life ===
It was unknown when she entered the palace as King Chunghye's 2nd wife, but it's estimated around 1331. In December 1348, after the childless King Chungmok, Princess Deoknyeong's son died, Yun's only son, Wang Jeo ascended the throne as the new king, but she was unable to act as his regent due to Deoknyeong's power.

Since she was the biological mother of the reigning King, her clan became one of the most powerful at that time and her maternal uncle, Min Hwan (민환) was said to believe in authority and his tyranny was very severe. Wanting to respect his biological mother, in 1349, King Chungjeong build a wealth for her and call it "Gyeongsun Mansion" (경순부; 慶順府) while gave her 1 Seung (승; 丞) and Ju-bu (주부; 注簿), also 2 Sa-in (사인; 舍人). After the death of Prince Yongsan, Yun took over the throne and made her influence in the court.

However, in 1352, King Chungjeong retired from the throne due to the Yuan dynasty's invasion and gave the throne to his uncle, Wang Gi. Knowing that her son went to Ganghwa Island, it was said that she spent several days crying with anxiety about him. Then, under King Gongmin's permission, she went to Ganghwa and stayed in there for a few days before meeting Chungjeong in person. In March 1352, King Chungjeong was poisoned in Ganghwa Island and she later died in 1380 (6th year reign of King U) after a long and lonely life.

=== Later life ===
Although Yun was the biological mother of the former King Chungjeong, the Goryeo royal families didn't perform any ancestral rites for her. Later, in January 1391, the reign king, Gongyang accepted the suggestion of Yejo (예조; 禮曹) and made the ancestral rites for her.

Her maternal first cousin, Min Je (민제) eventually became the father of Queen Wongyeong. As Consort Hui came from the Papyeong Yun clan, she became the ancestors of several Joseon's queens, such as: Queen Jeonghui, Queen Jeonghyeon, Queen Janggyeong, Queen Munjeong.

== Family ==
- Father
  - Yun Gye-jong (윤계종; 尹繼宗; 1280 – September 1341)
- Mother
  - Lady Min of the Yeoheung Min clan (여흥 민씨; 驪興 閔氏; 1284–1337)
- Siblings
  - Older brother - Yun In-gwi (윤인귀; 尹仁貴; 1300 – ?)
  - Younger brother - Yun Ahn-che (윤안체, 尹安䙗; 1318 – ?)
- Husband
  - Wang Jeong, King Chunghye of Goryeo (고려 충혜왕; 22 February 1315 – 30 January 1344)
    - Father-in-law - Wang Man, King Chungsuk of Goryeo (고려 충숙왕; 30 July 1294 – 3 May 1339)
    - Mother-in-law - Queen Gongwon of the Namyang Hong clan (공원왕후 홍씨; 25 August 1298 – 12 February 1380)
- Issue
  - Son - Wang Jeo, King Chungjeong of Goryeo (고려 충정왕; 9 January 1338 – 23 March 1352)
    - Granddaughter - Lady Wang (왕씨; 王氏; 1353 – ?)
    - Grandson - Wang Je (왕제; 王濟; 1355 – ?)

== In popular culture ==
- Portrayed by Ji Sung-won in the 2005–2006 MBC TV Series Shin Don.
