= Crown Princess Minhoe =

Crown Princess of Joseon (1611–1646)

Crown Princess of Joseon
- Tenure: 31 December 1627 – 21 May 1645
- Investiture: Sungjeongjeon, Gyeongdeokgung
- Predecessor: Crown Princess Park
- Successor: Crown Princess Jang
- Born: 18 April 1611; Hanseong, Joseon
- Died: 30 April 1646 (aged 35); Hanseong, Joseon
- Burial: Yeonghoewon, Gwangmyeong, South Korea
- Spouse: Crown Prince Sohyeon (m. 1627; died 1645)
- Issue Detail: 4 sons, 5 daughters
Posthumous name
- Crown Princess Minhoe (민회빈; 愍懷嬪)
- Clan: Geumcheon Kang (by birth); Jeonju Yi (by marriage)
- Dynasty: Yi
- Father: Kang Seok-gi
- Mother: Lady, of the Goryeong Shin clan

Korean name
- Hangul: 민회빈
- Hanja: 愍懷嬪
- RR: Minhoebin
- MR: Minhoebin

Crown Princess Minhoe (Korean: 민회빈; Hanja: 愍懷嬪; 18 April 1611 – 30 April 1646), of the Geumcheon Kang clan, also known as Crown Princess Sohyeon, was the wife of Crown Prince Sohyeon, the eldest son of King Injo. She was executed on presumably false charges of attempting to poison her father-in-law following her husband's suspicious death.

== Biography ==
=== Early life and lineage ===
The future Crown Princess Minhoe was born during the reign of Gwanghaegun, as the second daughter among five sons and three daughters. Her father was Kang Seok-gi (강석기), who would later become right state councilor, and her mother was lady from the Goryeong Shin clan (고령 신씨).

Her paternal grandmother and Song Jun-gil's mother were sisters, making Lady Kang a second cousin once removed of Queen Inhyeon, while her maternal grandfather, Shin Sik (신식), was a great-great-grandson of Shin Suk-ju's seventh son, Shin Hyeong (신형), and her maternal grandmother was a great-granddaughter of Shin Su-geun (신수근) and as such a descendant of Grand Prince Imyong. Via the latter lineage, Lady Kang was also a distant niece of Deposed Queen Shin and Queen Dangyeong.

=== Marriage ===
In 1627, at the age of 16, Lady Kang was designated as the bride of 15-year-old Crown Prince Sohyeon (then known as Crown Prince Wang), the eldest son of King Injo and Queen Inyeol. The selection process was a mere formality; it had been decided early on that she was the most suitable choice for the position of crown princess, probably due to her family's solid connections to the Westerners and marital alliances with numerous aristocratic families. Because the wedding took place soon after the Later Jin invasion, the ceremonies were kept frugal.

One year later, Lady Kang gave birth to her first child, a daughter. A second daughter, who would died prematurely after less than three months, was born in 1631, and the couple welcomed their first son, Yi Baek (이백), in 1636. Earlier that year, Lady Kang had become the highest-ranked woman in the internal court following the death of her mother-in-law, Queen Inyeol.

=== Second Manchu invasion ===
During the Qing invasion, Lady Kang fled to Ganghwa Island, but she was captured after Ganghwa fell on 26 January 1637. When King Injo surrendered four days later, Crown Prince Sohyeon, alongside Lady Kang, his younger brothers Grand Prince Bongrim and Grand Prince Inpyeong, and his sister-in-law Grand Princess Consort Pungan, were taken as hostages to Mukden in accordance with the peace treaty. Lady Kang's own younger brother, Kang Mun-myeong (강문명), volunteered to accompany the party. Grand Prince Inpyeong was allowed to return to Joseon in 1638, but the others would remain at the Qing court until 1645.

The couple's third daughter was born before the end of 1637 and throughout their captivity, Lady Kang gave birth to two more daughters in 1642 and 1643, as well as two sons in 1640 and 1644. There was also a fourth son born after Crown Prince Sohyeon's death in 1645, but the infant didn't survive.

=== Widowhood ===
In 1645, following the fall of the Ming dynasty, Crown Prince Sohyeon and Lady Kang returned to Joseon. However, as the period of captivity dragged on, misunderstanding and distrust had arisen between King Injo and Crown Prince Sohyeon, leading Injo to treat his son and daughter-in-law with cold animosity. On top of this, Gwiin Jo often slandered the couple in front the king, further deepening the rift.

The crown prince fell ill not long after arriving in the capital and died a few months later. His cause of death has generated speculation for centuries. At the time, many suspected he was poisoned at the order of Gwiin Jo or even King Injo himself, but today, illnesses such as pneumonia, vasculitis and type 1 diabetes are also considered plausible.

Shortly after Crown Prince Sohyeon's death, Grand Prince Bongrim (posthumously King Hyojong) was sent back to Joseon and promptly named crown prince. Some modern historians believe Injo chose his second son as successor instead of his grandson (i.e. Lady Kang's eldest son, Yi Baek) because he was already in poor health and didn't want to cause instability through the accession of a young king who would require a regency (Yi Baek had just passed his ninth birthday at the time).

=== Death and aftermath ===
In January 1646, poison was discovered in the abalone served to King Injo. Lady Kang was ultimately charged with the crime, deposed and ordered to commit suicide by poisoning. She was buried within the ancestral burial ground of the Geumcheon Kang clan in present-day Gwangmyeong, Gyeonggi Province.

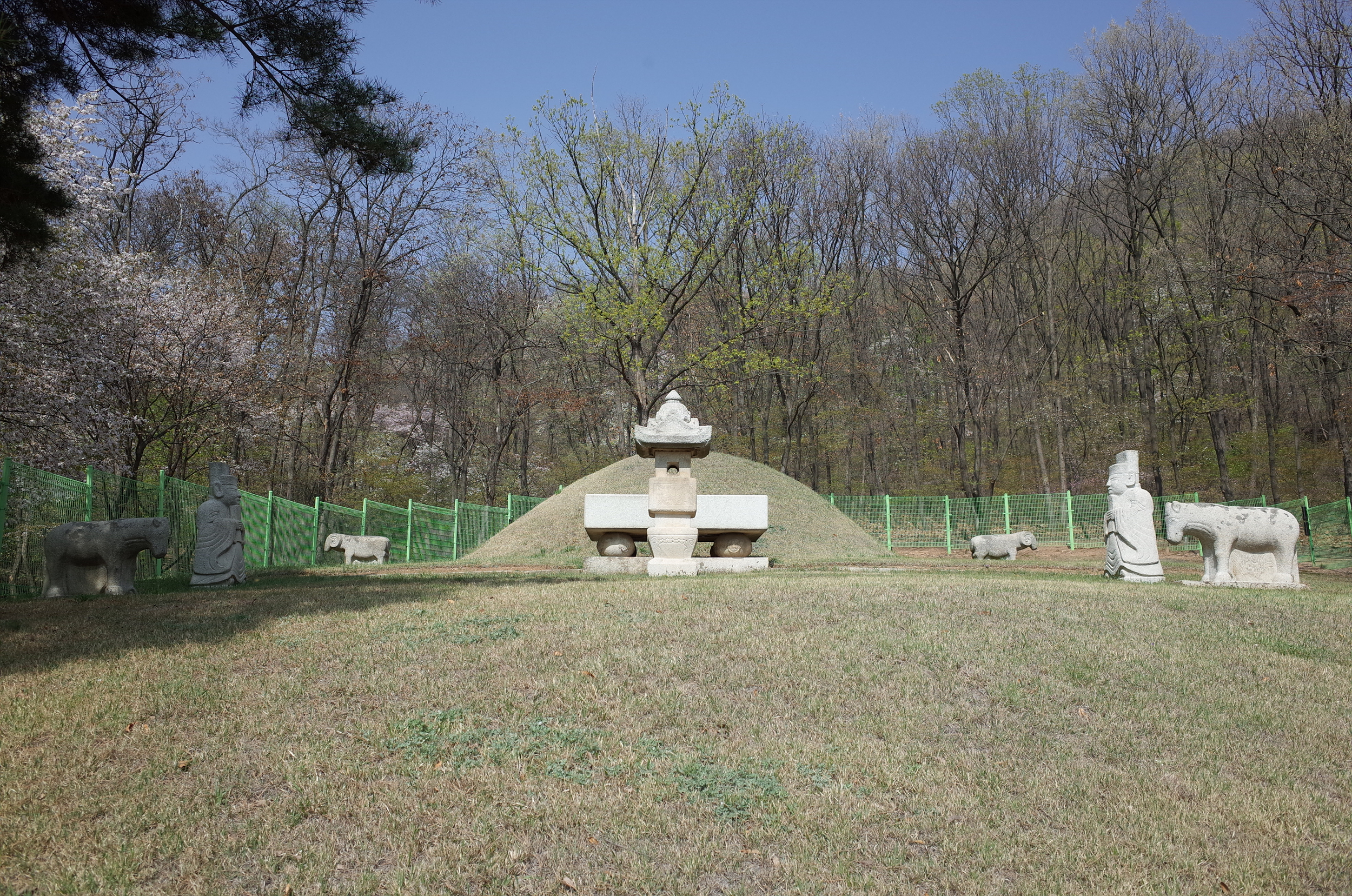
The tomb of Lady Kang

Subsequently, her sons were exiled to Jeju Island, with only the youngest surviving until release in 1656, and her daughters were banished from the palace. Her mother was also executed and the elder two among her brothers were flogged to death during interrogation, while the other two were exiled.

The prevailing theory is that the incident was orchestrated by Gwiin Jo, but a recent view is that she did everything with King Injo's tacit permission as the king wished to further legitimize his second son's position and eliminate any future danger to his rule. As long as Lady Kang and her sons maintained their status and had the support of Lady Kang's influential natal family, there would be the risk of a separate power base forming.

Lady Kang and her family were finally rehabilitated in 1718 and she received the posthumous name Minhoe (민회; lit. ''mourned and remembered with affection''). Her tomb, which was renovated according to the specifications for a crown princess and named Minhoebin (민회묘), was elevated to Yeonghoewon (영회원) during the reign of Emperor Gojong.

== Titles ==
- During the reign of Gwanghaegun (r. 1608–1623):
  - Lady, of the Geumcheon Kang clan (금천 강씨; 衿川姜氏; from 18 April 1611)
    - Kang Seok-gi's daughter (강석기의 딸)
    - Lady Kang (강씨; 姜氏)
- During the reign of King Injo (r. 1623–1649):
  - Crown Princess (왕세제빈; 王世弟嬪; from 31 December 1627)
  - Crown Princess Kang (강빈; 姜嬪; from 1645)
  - Commoner (Note: Informally known as "Traitor Kang" (역강; 逆姜).) (서인; 庶人; from 1646)
- During the reign of King Sukjong (r. 1674–1720):
  - Crown Princess Minhoe (민회빈; 愍懷嬪; from 1718)

== Family ==
- Father: Kang Seok-gi (강석기; 23 March 1580 – 28 July 1643)
- Mother: Lady, of the Goryeong Shin clan (고령 신씨; ?–1647); given name Ye-ok (예옥)
- Sibling(s)
  - Kang Mun-seong (강문성; 1603–1646) (Note: ▪︎Lady, of the Pyongsan Shin clan (평산 신씨); fourth daughter of Chief State Councilor Shin Heum (신흠; 1566–1628). ▪︎Issue: 1 adopted son, 5 daughters.)
  - Lady, of the Geumcheon Kang clan (금천 강씨) (Note: Married Jeong Tae-je (정태제) from the Dongnae Jeong clan (동래 정씨).)
  - Kang Mun-myeong (강문명; 1613–1646) (Note: ▪︎Wife: Lady, of the (new) Andong Kim clan (신 안동 김씨), given name Il-yeong (일영); fourth daughter of Kim Gwang-hyeon (김광현; 1584–1647) and first cousin of Queen Inseon. ▪︎Issue: 2 sons, 2 daughters.)
  - Kang Mun-du (강문두; 1615–?) (Note: ▪︎Wife: Lady, of the Pyongsan Shin clan (평산 신씨; 1615–?), given name Sun-kang (순강); third daughter of Shin Ik-seong (신익성; 1588–1644) and Princess Jeongsuk (정숙옹주; 1587–1627), and granddaughter of King Seonjo and Chief State Councilor Shin Heum (신흠; 1566–1628). ▪︎Issue: 1 son, 3 daughters.)
  - Kang Mun-byeok (강문벽) (Note: ▪︎Wife: Lady, of the Yi clan (이씨). ▪︎Issue: 1 son, 1 daughter.)
  - Kang Mun-jeong (강문정; 1623 – c. 1642) (Note: ▪︎Lady, of the Namyang Hong clan (남양 홍씨). ▪︎Issue: none.)
  - Lady, of the Geumcheon Kang clan (금천 강씨) (Note: Married Yi Hong-sang (이홍상; 1619–?) from the Yonan Yi clan (연안 이씨).)
- Husband: Crown Prince Sohyeon (소현세자; 5 February 1612 – 21 May 1645)
  - Father-in-law: King Injo (인조대왕; 7 December 1595 – 17 June 1649)
  - Mother-in-law: Queen Inyeol (인렬왕후), of the Cheongju Han clan (청주 한씨; 16 August 1594 – 16 January 1636)
  - Stepmother-in-law: Queen Jangnyeol (장렬왕후), of the Yangju Jo clan (양주 조씨; 16 December 1624 – 20 September 1688)
- Issue
  - Unnamed daughter (1628 – c. 1640)
  - Unnamed daughter (1631)
  - Yi Baek (이백), Prince Gyeongseon (경선군; 30 April 1636 – 2 November 1648) (Note: His childhood name was Seok-cheol (석철).) (Note: ▪︎Wife: none. ▪︎Issue: 1 adopted son.)
  - County Princess Gyeongsuk (경숙군주; 1637–1655) (Note: Married Gu Bong-jang (구봉장; 1638–1658) from the Neungseong Gu clan (능성 구씨). They had issue (1 son).)
  - Prince Gyeongwan (경완군; 1640 – 4 February 1649) (Note: His childhood name was Seok-rin (석린).) (Note: ▪︎Wife: none. ▪︎Issue: 1 adopted son.)
  - County Princess Gyeongnyeong (경녕군주; 1642–1682) (Note: Married Park Tae-jeong (박태정; 1640–1688) from the Bannam Park clan (반남 박씨). They had issue (5 sons, 4 daughters).)
  - County Princess Gyeongsun (경순군주; 1643–1697); given name Jeong-on (정온) (Note: Married Byun Gwang-bo (변광보; 1644–1661) from the Hwangju Byun clan (황주 변씨). They had no issue.)
  - Yi Hoe (이회), Prince Gyeongan (경안군; 3 November 1644 – 22 October 1665) (Note: His childhood name was Seok-gyeon (석견).) (Note: ▪︎Wife: Princess Consort Bunseong (분성군부인), of the Gimhae Heo clan (김해 허씨; 1645–1723); daughter of Heo Hwak (허확). ▪︎Issue: 2 sons.)
  - Unnamed son (1645)

== Ancestry ==
Ancestors of Crown Princess Minhoe

Kang Noe (강뇌)
Kang Yu-gyeong (강유경)
Kang Chan (강찬)
Kang Seok-gi (강석기)
Kim Ho (김호)
Kim Eun-hwi (김은휘)
Lady, of the Jeonui Yi clan (전의 이씨)
Lady, of the Gwangsan Kim clan (광산 김씨)
Crown Princess Minhoe
Shin Seo (신서)
Shin Jung-eom 신중엄
Shin Sik (신식)
Yu Eom (유엄)
Lady, of the Munhwa Yu clan (문화 유씨)
Lady, of the Goryeong Shin clan (고령 신씨)
No Han-mun (노한문)
No Gae (노개)
Lady, of the Munhwa Yu clan (문화 유씨)
Lady, of the Gwangju No clan (광주 노씨)
Shin Hong-pil (신홍필)
Lady, of the Geochang Shin clan (거창 신씨)
Lady, of the Pyongyang Jo clan (평양 조씨)

== In popular culture ==
- Portrayed by Lee Min-hee in the 1981 KBS1 TV series Daemyeong.
- Portrayed by Choi Jung-won in the 1986–1987 MBC TV series 500 Years of Joseon: Namhan Mountain Fortress.
- Portrayed by Lee Sun-young in the 2007–2008 KBS1 TV documentary series The Story of Korean History.
- Portrayed by Yang So-min in the 2008 KBS2 TV series Strongest Chil Woo.
- Portrayed by Kim Ha-yoon in the 2010 KBS2 TV series The Slave Hunters.
- Portrayed by Kyung Soo-jin in the 2012–2013 MBC TV series The King's Doctor.
- Portrayed by Song Seon-mi in the 2013 JTBC TV series Blooded Palace: The War of Flowers.
- Portrayed by Seo Hyun-jin in the 2014 tvN TV series The Three Musketeers.
- Portrayed by Kim Hee-jung in the 2015 MBC TV series Splendid Politics.
- Portrayed by Jo Yun-seo in the 2022 film The Night Owl.
- Portrayed by Jeon Hye-won in the 2023 MBC TV series My Dearest.

== See also ==
- History of Korea
- Styles and titles in Joseon

== Sources ==
- 역대인물종합정보 시스템-민회빈강씨
- "[THIS WEEK IN HISTORY]Taking a stand but paying the price of life". Korea JoongAng Daily. Archived from the original on 18 December 2014.
