= Hwa-bi Hong =

Korean royal consort (fl. 14th century)

Royal Consort Hwa 화비

Royal consort of Goryeo
- Tenure: 1342–1344
- Coronation: 1342
- Successor: Royal Consort Im
- Spouse: Chunghye of Goryeo (m. 1342; died 1344)
- House: Namyang Hong (by birth); House of Wang (by marriage)
- Father: Hong-Tak
- Mother: Lady, of the Andong Gwon clan

Royal Consort Hwa of the Namyang Hong clan (Korean: 화비 홍씨; Hanja: 和妃 洪氏; lit. 'Splendid Consort Hong') was a Korean royal consort and the third wife of King Chunghye of Goryeo.

== Biography ==
=== Early life and relatives ===
The future Consort Hwa was born as the daughter of Hong-Tak, Internal Prince Ikseong (홍탁 익성부원군), son of Hong-Seon (홍선) from the Namyang Hong clan and Lady Gwon (부인 권씨), daughter of Gwon-Jun, Internal Prince Gilchang (권준 길창부원군) from the Andong Gwon clan. She had:

- 1 older brother: Hong Sang-jae (홍상재)
- 3 younger brothers:
  - Hong Hye-chan (홍혜찬)
  - Hong Gae-do (홍개도)
  - Hong Chang-do (홍창도)

Her paternal great-great-grandfather was Hong Baek-su (홍백수), the younger brother of Hong Bok-won (홍복원) who was surrendered to Mongolian side during the long war between Korea and Mongolia. King Chungsuk's 5th wife, Consort Su was her maternal cousin.

=== Marriage and Palace life ===
Firstly, her father, Hong-Tak was an ambassador from Gyeongsang Province (경상도진변사; 慶尙道鎭邊使) and when King Chunghye heard her beauty, he then gave Hong-Tak clothes and alcohol, also bestowed Royal title Splendid Consort (화비; 和妃) to Lady Hong in 1342. At this time, the King's other consort, Lady Im who entered the palace two years earlier than Hong fell jealous and then the King appointed Im as Princess Euncheon (은천옹주; 銀川翁主) to comforted her.

Rather than stayed in the palace, Hong instead lived in Prime Minister Yun-Chim (윤침; 尹忱)'s manor, so Chunghye can travel easier when he wanted to met her. However, his love and interest on her were grew tired and cut off within a few days. As a result, they didn't have any issue. According to Goryeosa, in 1343, Chunghye visited Hong's house again.
