= Prince Yongsan =

Goryeo prince (1325–1341)

Heir Successor Yongsan

Heir Successor (Prince) of Goryeo
- Reign: 1325–1341
- Coronation: 1325
- Predecessor: Wang Jeong (Note: Half older brother.)
- Successor: Wang Gi (Note: Half younger brother.)
- Monarch: King Chungsuk
- Born: 1325 (Note: In the Korean calendar (lunisolar), on 15 August 1325 (12th year reign of his father), he was honoured as Heir Successor Yongsan because his birth place was Yongsan, so was he named that.: 《고려사》권35〈세가〉권35 - 충숙왕 12년 8월 - 왕과 공주가 한양 용산의 언덕에서 묵다; 《고려사》권91〈열전〉권4 - 용산원자); Yongsan District, Hanyang, Goryeo
- Died: 1341 (aged about 17); Empire of Great Yuan
- House: House of Wang
- Father: Chungsuk of Goryeo
- Mother: Princess Joguk of the Yuan Borjigin clan

Korean name
- Hangul: 용산원자
- Hanja: 龍山元子
- Lit.: Primary Son Yongsan
- RR: Yongsan wonja
- MR: Yongsan wŏnja

Prince Yongsan (Korean: 용산원자; Hanja: 龍山元子; 1325–1341) was a Goryeo royal prince and the heir to the throne as the only son of King Chungsuk of Goryeo and Princess Joguk. However, his mother died at 17 years old not long after he was born.

According to Goryeosa records written by Jeong Bang-gil (정방길) in 1330, it was said that the Prince didn't have a good relationship with his half older brother, the 16 years old Prince Wang Jeong who was 10 years older than Yongsan. Then, Bang-gil told Wang Jeong who wanted go to Yuan dynasty for join with Prince Yongsan to go there, but Jo Ik-cheong (조익청) said "It's Impossible" (불가하다) and he then stopped it. Meanwhile, considering that Yongsan was in Yuan until his death, it is highly probable that he went to the Yuan dynasty between 1330 and 1341 and died in there during his stay. After his death, his body was transported to Goryeo for the funeral, but his tomb site was unknown because no records left about that.

== Ancestry ==
Ancestors of Heir Successor Yongsan

Wang Geo, King Chungnyeol 충렬왕 왕거
Wang Won, King Chungseon 충선왕 왕원
Borjigin Holdoro Gerimisil 보르지긴 홀도로 게리미실
Wang Do, King Chungsuk 충숙왕 왕도
Yasokjin 야속진
Primary Son Yongsan 용산원자
Borjigin Darmabala 보르지긴 다르마발라
Borjigin Amuga 보르지긴 아무가
Concubine Gwak 비자 곽씨
Borjigin Geumdong 보르지긴 금동
