= Royal Consort Wonbi Hong =

Goryeo consort (fl. 13th–14th centuries)

Won-bi Hong 원비 홍씨
- Royal Consort of Goryeo
- Died: 21 September 1306; Goryeo
- Spouse: Chungseon of Goryeo
- House: Namyang Hong clan (by birth); House of Wang (by marriage)
- Father: Hong Gyu
- Mother: Lady Gim, Grand Lady of Gwangju County
- Religion: Buddhism

Lady Sunhwa, Consort Won of the Namyang Hong clan (Korean: 순화원비 남양 홍씨; Hanja: 順和院妃 南陽 洪氏; lit. 'Primary Consort Sunhwa of the Namyang Hong clan'; d. 21 September 1306) (Note: In the Korean calendar (lunisolar), she died on the 13rd day of the 8th month of 1306.) was a Goryeo royal consort as the fourth wife of King Chungseon. She was the older sister of her stepson's wife, Queen Gongwon.
