= Prince Gwangneung =

Goryeo prince (fl. 13th – 14th century)

- Crown Prince Wang Gam (세자 왕감; 世子 王鑑)

Crown Prince of Goryeo
- Reign: c.1308–May 1310
- Predecessor: Crown Prince Wang Won
- Successor: Crown Prince Wang Jeong
- Monarch: King Chungseon (father)
- Born: Wang Gam; Goryeo
- Died: May 1310; Empire of Great Yuan
- Burial: Goryeo
Regnal name
- Prince Gwangneung(Gwangreung) 광릉군; 廣陵君
- House: House of Wang
- Father: Wang Jang, King Chungseon
- Mother: Yasokjin, Consort Ui

Korean name
- Hangul: 왕감
- Hanja: 王鑑
- RR: Wang Gam
- MR: Wang Kam

Royal title
- Hangul: 광릉군
- Hanja: 廣陵君
- RR: Gwangneunggun
- MR: Kwangnŭnggun

Courtesy name
- Hangul: 의충
- Hanja: 宜忠
- RR: Uichung
- MR: Ŭich'ung

Prince Gwangneung or Prince Gwangreung (died May 1310), personal name Wang Gam was a Goryeo Royal Prince as the first and oldest son of King Chungseon and Consort Ui.

In 1298, he was appointed as the part of Yeongga Army Envoy (영가군승선사; 永嘉軍承宣使) and a year later he honoured "Prince Gwangneung" before later became the Crown Prince (세자; 世子). While his father in Yuan Dynasty, he wanted to hand over the throne to Gwangneung, but it was stopped due to the persuasion of his followers. However, he got involved in the issue of throne's succession those made him sentenced to death and murdered by his own father due to some accusations and misunderstandings in Yuan, along with his servant, Gim Ui-jung (김의중; 金義重). Not long after this, his body was transported and returned to Seongnam, Goryeo for the funeral and burial in the Southern Part of one of the Gaegyeong's fortress. Although his birth date was unknown, but it seems that Wang Gam died before reach 20-years-old.
