= Su-bi Kwŏn =

Su-bi Kwŏn 수비 권씨
- Royal consort of Goryeo
- Died: 29 April 1335; Goryeo
- Spouse: Unnamed man Chungsuk of Goryeo
Posthumous name
- Consort Su (수비; 壽妃)
- House: Andong Kwŏn clan
- Father: Kwŏn Ryŏm
- Mother: Lady Cho of the Pyongyang Cho clan

Royal Consort Su of the Andong Kwŏn clan (Korean: 수비 안동 권씨; Hanja: 壽妃 安東 權氏; died 29 April 1340 (Note: In the Chinese calendar (lunar), she died on 3 April 1340.)) was the fifth wife of King Chungsuk of Goryeo.

== Biography ==
=== Early life and relatives ===
The future Royal Consort Su was born into the Andong Kwŏn clan as the eldest daughter and second child of Kwŏn Ryŏm, Prince Hyeonbok (현복군; 玄禑君) and his wife who was from the Pyongyang Jo clan. King Chunghye's third wife, Lady Hong was once Lady Kwŏn's cousin.

Her paternal great-grandfather was Kwŏn Po, Internal Prince Yeongga (권보 영가부원군) and her paternal grandfather was Kwŏn Chun, Internal Prince Gilchang (권준 길창부원군) who kept his loyalty to King Chungsuk when other servants loyal on Wang Ko. From Kwŏn Chun's succession, the Andong Kwŏn clan became a prestigious family and had a lot of wealth. His manor was said to admired by the king when he visited.

=== Marriage and palace life ===
Lady Kwŏn was firstly marry to Jeon-Sin (전신)'s son, but her father tried to divorced them due to the quality of the Chŏn family clan (전씨; 全氏). Then, in 1335 (4th years reign of King Chungsuk), the couple finally divorced under the pretext of an order from the king and Lady Kwŏn was honoured the Consort Su (수비; 壽妃) upon becoming the king's new consort.

In 1339, after King Chungsuk's death, Lady Kwŏn and his other wife–Princess Gyeonghwa was raped by his son and successor, King Chunghye.

=== Later life ===
Lady Kwŏn died childless on 29 April 1340, and her father, Kwŏn Ryŏm also died in the same year at 39 years old, so it was believed that she died at a young age (mid 20s) possibly by suicide after the shock of being raped.

== Family ==
- Father: Kwŏn Ryŏm (권렴, 權廉; 1302–1340)
- Mother: Lady Cho of the Pyongyang Cho clan (평양 조씨)
- Husbands
  - Unknown 1st husband (son of Chŏn Sin (전신; 全信) – No issue.
  - 2nd husband: King Chungsuk of Goryeo (고려 충숙왕; 1294–1339) – No issue.
