= Wang Heun =

Wang Heun may refer to:

- Myeongjong of Goryeo (1131–1202), born Wang Heun, king of Goryeo
- Chungmok of Goryeo (1337–1348), personal name Wang Heun, king of Goryeo
