= Wang Seokgi =

Korean Buddhist monk (1341–1375)

- Born: 1341; Goryeo
- Died: 1375 (aged about 34/5); Goryeo
- Spouse: a civilian woman
- Issue: One son
- House: House of Wang
- Father: Chunghye of Goryeo
- Mother: Princess Euncheon
- Religion: Buddhism

Korean name
- Hangul: 왕석기
- Hanja: 王釋器
- RR: Wang Seokgi
- MR: Wang Sŏkki

Wang Seokgi (Korean: 왕석기; 1341–1375) was the youngest son of King Chunghye of Goryeo, from Princess Euncheon and also a Korean Buddhist monk.

Under King Chungjeong's command, Seokgi went to Mandeok Temple (만덕사; 萬德寺) in Yuan China, but later returned to Gaegyeong by King Gongmin's command. In 1356, Seokgi was imprisoned in Sugunok (순군옥; 巡軍獄) after tried to rebel and ascended the theone with the help from former general Im Jung-bo (임중보), Son Su-gyeong (손수경), Hong-Jun (홍준), governor Son-Yong (손용) and 6 others were executed. Seokgi was enshrined in Jeju Island and tried to be killed by drowning it in the sea during the convoy, but later was survived in a private manor.

In 1363, Jeon Nok-saeng (전녹생, reported that a man named Wang Seokgi was plotting a rebellion in Pyongyang and immediately arrested, beheaded, and sent him to Gaegyeong. However, the person who Jeon killed was not Wang Seokgi, but he belonged to his person who accompanied him. King Gongmin hanged his head sent by Gim Yu (김유) to an author and beheaded those who falsely reported the pregnancy of Princess Euncheon. Their close associates were also executed.

After this, Seokgi fled and lived in hiding in a private house owned by Baek Eo-rin (백언린) in Anhyeop (안협; 安峽), married a civilian woman and later had a son. They lived quietly for a while, but in 1375, this fact was known into Yi In-im (이인임), Gyeong Bu-heung (경부흥), Choe Yeong (최영), Choe In-cheol (최인철) and other officials, those made Seokgi and his son were really executed and killed.
