= Consort Ui =

Consort Ui may refer to:

- Yasokjin (died 1316), wife of Chungseon of Goryeo
- Royal Noble Consort Uibin Seong (1753–1786), concubine of Jeongjo of Joseon
