= Consort Su =

Consort Su may refer to:

== Consorts with the surname Su ==
- Daji (fl. 11th century BC), consort of Di Xin, known as Su Daji in popular culture
- Imperial Noble Consort Chunhui (1713–1760), concubine of the Qianlong Emperor

== Consorts with the title Consort Su ==
- Su-bi Gwon (died 1340), Chungsuk of Goryeo's concubine
- Queen Insu (1437–1504), wife of Crown Prince Uigyeong, known as Consort Su before her son Seongjong of Joseon honored her as a queen
- Royal Noble Consort Subin Park (1770–1822), concubine of Jeongjo of Joseon
