= Jeon Hye-won =

South Korean actress (born 1998)

- Born: April 2, 1998 (age 28); Busan, South Korea
- Education: Seoul Institute of the Arts (Department of Performing Arts)
- Occupation: Actress
- Years active: 2015–present
- Agent: Y.ONE Entertainment

Korean name
- Hangul: 전혜원
- RR: Jeon Hyewon
- MR: Chŏn Hyewŏn

Jeon Hye-won (Korean: 전혜원; born April 2, 1998) is a South Korean actress. She is known for roles in television dramas such as Our Beloved Summer (2021–2022) and Love (ft. Marriage and Divorce) (2021).

== Filmography ==
=== Film ===
Year	Title	Role	Notes	Ref.
2015	0000	Ui-jeong	Short film	
2016	Just One Day	Ju-yeon		
2018	Champion	High School Girl 1		
2022	20th Century Girl	'Darn it'		

=== Television series ===
Year	Title	Role	Notes	Ref.
2017	Because This Is My First Life	Lee Eun-sol		
2018	A Poem a Day	Choi Yoon-hee		
2018	Sketch	Choi Seon-yeong		
2020–2021	True Beauty	Park Sae-mi		
2021	Undercover	Kim Myung-jae's daughter		
2021–2022	Love (ft. Marriage and Divorce)	Park Hyang-ki	Season 1–3	
2021–2022	Our Beloved Summer	Jung Chae-ran		
2022	Love All Play	Yang Seong-sil		
2022	Alchemy of Souls	Ae-hyang	Cameo (episode 1–3)	
2022	Under the Queen's Umbrella	Cho-wol		
2022	KBS Drama Special: "Silence of the Lambs"	Lim Da-in	One act-drama	
2023	My Dearest	Crown Princess Kang		
2024	No Gain No Love	Kwon Yi-rin		
2026	A Trap Called Desire	Go Eun-seol		

=== Web series ===
Year	Title	Role	Ref.
2018	Mode Vol.1	Shin Se-hee	
2020	Kiss Goblin	Oh Yeon-ah	
