= Sukbin Hong =

Korean royal consort (fl. 15th century)

- Royal Consort of the Senior First Rank
- Born: after 1417; Joseon
- Died: after 1485; Joseon
- Consort of: King Munjong
- Issue: 1 daughter
- Clan: Namyang Hong (by birth); Jeonju Yi (by marriage)
- Dynasty: Yi
- Father: Hong Sim
- Mother: Lady, of the Papyeong Yun clan

Korean name
- Hangul: 숙빈 홍씨
- Hanja: 肅嬪 洪氏
- RR: Sukbin Hongssi
- MR: Sukpin Hongssi

Sukbin Hong (Korean: 숙빈 홍씨; Hanja: 肅嬪 洪氏; birth and death dates unknown), or Concubine Suk, (Note: The literal translation of bin (빈; 嬪) is "concubine". Combined with the honorific title suk (숙; 肅), the full meaning is "Respectful Concubine".) of the Namyang Hong clan, was a consort of King Munjong, the fifth monarch of Joseon.

== Biography ==
=== Early life and lineage ===
Lady Hong was most likely born during the reign of King Sejong. The exact date and year of birth are unknown, but the Veritable Records of the Joseon Dynasty mention that she was younger than Queen Hyeondeok. Her father was Hong Sim (홍심), who served as governor of Hanseong (한성판윤), and her mother was a lady from the Papyeong Yun clan (파평 윤씨). She had two known brothers, with records showing a further three brothers and three sisters.

Her younger brother, Hong Eung (홍응), served as left state councilor during the reign of King Seongjong, and his son, Hong Sang (홍상), married Princess Myeongsuk in 1466.

On her maternal side, Lady Hong was a first cousin of Soyong Yun (소용 윤씨; another one of King Munjong's consorts), a first cousin once removed of Queen Jeonghui, a second cousin twice removed of Queen Janggyeong and Yun Im, a second cousin three times removed of Queen Munjeong and Yun Won-hyeong, and a third cousin once removed of Queen Jeonghyeon.

=== As royal consort ===
In 1431, when King Munjong was still crown prince, Lady Hong was officially selected as his consort, alongside Lady Gwon (posthumously Queen Hyeondeok) and Lady Jeong (later known as Soyong Jeong). The three of them were officially appointed as consorts of the crown prince of the junior fourth rank (승휘; seunghwi) and entered the palace together.

Despite Lady Hong being closest to the crown prince at the time when Crown Princess Bong was deposed, King Sejong chose Lady Gwon as the new crown princess, because she was older, held the higher rank, and had given birth to the crown prince's only surviving child, Princess Gyeonghye.

Meanwhile, Lady Hong gave birth to a daughter in 1441, but the child died three years later.

After King Munjong acceded to the throne, she was promoted to a royal consort of the junior first rank (귀인; gwiin) and given the authority to manage the internal court since the position of queen was empty.

In 1452, a few months after Danjong succeeded his father, she was elevated to the senior first rank (빈; bin), with the honorific title suk (肅), meaning "respectful".

=== Later life and death ===
Lady Hong moved into a residence that had belonged to the late Grand Prince Anpyeong and stepped down from her position as leader of the internal court following Danjong's marriage to Queen Jeongsun.

Her last appearance in official records was in 1485. It remains unknown when she died and where her tomb is located.

== Titles ==
- During the reign of King Sejong (r. 1418–1450):
  - Lady, of the Namyang Hong clan (남양 홍씨; 南陽洪氏; from unknown date)
    - Hong Sim's daughter (홍심의 딸)
    - Lady Hong (홍씨; 洪氏)
  - Seunghwi (Note: lit. ''Lady of Inherent Glory'') (승휘; 承徽; from 5 May 1431), consort of the crown prince of the junior fourth rank
- During the reign of King Munjong (r. 1450–1452):
  - Gwiin (Note: lit. ''Noble Lady'') (귀인; 貴人; from 1450), royal consort of the junior first rank
- During the reign of King Danjong (r. 1452–1455):
  - Concubine Suk (숙빈; 肅嬪; from 30 August 1452), royal consort of the senior first rank

== Family ==
- Father: Hong Sim (홍심; 1398–1456)
- Mother: Lady, of the Papyeong Yun clan (파평 윤씨)
- Sibling(s)
  - Hong Eung (홍응; 1428–1492) (Note: ▪︎Wife: Lady, of the Anseong Yi clan (안성 이씨); daughter of Yi Bal-saeng (이발생). ▪︎Issue: 1 son.)
  - Hong Heung (홍흥; 1434–1501)
- Consort of: King Munjong (문종대왕; 15 November 1414 – 10 June 1452)
- Issue
  - Unnamed daughter (1441–1444)

== Ancestry ==
Ancestors of Sukbin Hong

Hong Yu-ryong (홍유룡)
Hong Deok-bo (홍덕보)
Hong Sim (홍심)
Concubine Suk
Yun Cheok (윤척)
Yun Seung-rye (윤승례)
Lady, of the Jeonui Yi clan (전의 이씨)
Yun Gyu (윤규)
Seong Yeo-wan (성여완)
Lady, of the Changnyeong Seong clan (창녕 성씨)
Lady, of the Papyeong Yun clan (파평 윤씨)

== In popular culture ==
- Portrayed by Jang Hee-jin in the 1984–1985 MBC TV series 500 Years of Joseon: The Ume Tree in the Midst of the Snow.
- Portrayed by Park Young-gwi in the 1994 KBS2 TV series Han Myung Hoe.
- Portrayed by Jang Seo-hee in the 1998–2000 KBS1 TV series The King and the Queen.

== See also ==
- Styles and titles in Joseon
- History of Korea
- List of Joseon royal consorts
