= A Trap Called Desire =

2026 South Korean television series

- Promotional poster
- Hangul: 욕망의 덫
- Hanja: 慾望의 덫
- Lit.: Trap of Desire
- RR: Yongmangui deot
- MR: Yongmangŭi tŏt
- Genre: Revenge drama
- Written by: Koo Ji-won
- Directed by: Lee Dae-kyung; Jung Kwang-soo
- Starring: Jang Seo-hee; Jeon Hye-won; Seol Jung-hwan; Joo Sae-byeok; Jang Se-hyun
- Country of origin: South Korea
- Original language: Korean
- No. of episodes: 62

Production
- Running time: 30 minutes
- Production companies: Studio Bom; Bamboo Network; Highline Company

Original release
- Network: KBS2
- Release: August 10, 2026 – present

A Trap Called Desire (Korean: 욕망의 덫) is an ongoing South Korean revenge drama television series written by Koo Ji-won, directed by Lee Dae-kyung and Jung Kwang-soo, and starring Jang Seo-hee, Jeon Hye-won, Seol Jung-hwan, Joo Sae-byeok, and Jang Se-hyun. The series centers on a woman wrongfully convicted of murder as she seeks to clear her name. It premiered on KBS2 on August 10, 2026, and airs every Monday to Friday at 19:50 (KST). It is also available for streaming on Kocowa.

== Synopsis ==
Joo Ae-suk, consumed by envy of another woman's life, orchestrates a switch between her own daughter and the heiress of a wealthy family. Under the new identity of Joo Mi-ran, she infiltrates the household as their nanny to observe her biological daughter, Kang Hae-ra. Meanwhile, the true heiress, Go Eun-seol, is adopted by Ae-suk's former friend, Park Hee-jung. By fate, both daughters attend the same school, where Eun-seol faces conflict with Hae-ra. When Hee-jung discovers the truth about the swap, she plans to reveal it to Eun-seol's biological parents. However, she is killed by Joo Mi-ran after being pushed off a building rooftop. Eun-seol arrives to find her adoptive mother already dead. She is unexpectedly framed for the crime and arrested during the funeral. Upon her release from prison, Go Eun-seol vows to clear her name, and her first plan is to track down the fake witness, Lee Jung-tae, who accused her of murder. She subsequently joins the Cheongma Group, where she becomes involved with her first love Cha Seok-jin and her rival Kang Hae-ra while searching for the real culprit.

== Cast and characters ==
=== Main ===
- Jang Seo-hee as Joo Mi-ran (formerly Joo Ae-suk), the head of the PR department at the Cheongma Scholarship Foundation. She is the real murderer who killed Park Hee-jung and framed Eun-seol for it.
- Jeon Hye-won as Go Eun-seol, who was wrongly framed and served 10 years in prison. She is the new employee designer in the Cheongma Group Design Team. She earns the position through the company's internal designer competition.
- Seol Jung-hwan as Cha Seok-jin, the Cheongma Group Head of Strategic Planning. He is Eun-seol's first love, but was engaged in an arranged marriage to Hae-ra.
- Joo Sae-byeok as Kang Hae-ra, the sole heiress of the Cheongma Group and the head of the design team.
- Jang Se-hyun as Seo Hyun-jae, the head of the legal team at Cheongma Group.

=== Supporting ===
- Yoon Hae-young as Kim Jeong-seon, a former actress who is the chairperson of the Cheongma Scholarship Foundation. She is Eun-seol's biological mother.
- Yoo Tae-woong as Kang Young-hoon, Jeong-seon's husband, who is the CEO of Cheongma Holdings.
- Son Seong-yoon as Seo Mi-rae, Hyun-jae's older sister.
- Seo Kwon-soon as Wang Geum-ja, Eun-seol's adoptive grandmother.
- Choi Jae-won as Go Gi-han, Eun-seol's adoptive father.
- Park Hyun-jung as Park So-yeon, Seok-jin's mother.
- Park Sung-kyu as Go Eun-guk, Eun-seol's adoptive older brother.

==== Others ====
- Kim Kwang-young as Ahn Guk-cheol, Mi-ran's ex-husband and Hae-ra's biological father.
- Yoo Jin-seok as Choi Jun-hwan, Mi-ran's secretary.

=== Special appearance ===
- Seo Yoo-jung as Park Hee-jung, Eun-seol's adoptive mother.

== Production ==
=== Development ===
The series is directed by Lee Dae-kyung and Jung Kwang-soo, written by Koo Ji-won, and co-produced by Studio Bom, Bamboo Network, and Highline Company.

=== Casting ===
On June 13, 2026, Ilgan Sports reported that Jang Seo-hee was cast as the main antagonist, and her appearance was confirmed on June 30. The series marks Jang's return to KBS dramas after 12 years since Two Mothers (2014). Nine actors were announced the following month. Jeon Hye-won was confirmed as the main protagonist, whose life falls apart after being falsely accused.

== Viewership ==
A Trap Called Desire : South Korea viewers per episode (millions)

Episodes	Episode number																								
Episodes	1	2	3	4	5	6	7	8	9	10	11	12	13	14	15	16	17	18	19	20	21	22	23	24	25
1–25	1.227	1.224	1.212	1.292	1.324	1.324	1.309	1.384	1.260	1.416	1.396	1.343	1.409	1.356	1.484	1.447	1.534	1.373	1.354	1.395	1.419	1.408	1.491	1.437	1.291
26–50	1.436	1.370	1.407	1.518	1.410	1.288	1.302	1.363	1.365	1.516	1.510	1.492	1.525	1.450	1.478	1.395	1.349	1.386	1.253	1.353	1.316	1.506	1.304	1.467	1.436
51–75	1.386	1.407	1.375	1.519	1.480	1.475	1.349	1.559	1.609	1.591	1.537	1.525	TBD	TBD	TBD	TBD	TBD	TBD	TBD	TBD	TBD	TBD	TBD	TBD	TBD
76–100	TBD	TBD	TBD	TBD	TBD	TBD	TBD	TBD	TBD	TBD	TBD	TBD	TBD	TBD	TBD	TBD	TBD	TBD	TBD	TBD	TBD	TBD	TBD	TBD	TBD

Source: Audience measurement performed nationwide by Nielsen Korea.

Average TV viewership ratings
Ep.	Original broadcast date	Average audience share (Nielsen Korea)	
Ep.	Original broadcast date	Nationwide	Seoul
1	August 10, 2026	6.4% (4th)	5.2% (5th)
2	August 11, 2026	6.0% (4th)	4.6% (5th)
3	August 12, 2026	6.2% (5th)	4.6% (6th)
4	August 13, 2026	6.8% (4th)	4.9% (4th)
5	August 14, 2026	7.0% (4th)	5.7% (6th)
6	August 17, 2026	6.9% (3rd)	5.3% (5th)
7	August 18, 2026	6.5% (4th)	4.8% (5th)
8	August 19, 2026	7.3% (3rd)	5.6% (4th)
9	August 20, 2026	6.3% (3rd)	4.8% (5th)
10	August 21, 2026	7.5% (3rd)	6.3% (6th)
11	August 24, 2026	7.5% (3rd)	6.2% (3rd)
12	August 25, 2026	7.2% (3rd)	5.7% (4th)
13	August 26, 2026	7.5% (2nd)	5.6% (4th)
14	August 27, 2026	7.2% (4th)	5.9% (4th)
15	August 28, 2026	7.9% (4th)	6.1% (5th)
16	August 31, 2026	7.8% (3rd)	6.3% (3rd)
17	September 1, 2026	7.9% (2nd)	6.0% (2nd)
18	September 2, 2026	7.6% (2nd)	5.7% (3rd)
19	September 3, 2026	7.1% (3rd)	5.5% (4th)
20	September 4, 2026	7.9% (3rd)	6.1% (4th)
21	September 7, 2026	7.6% (2nd)	6.3% (3rd)
22	September 8, 2026	7.6% (2nd)	6.1% (2nd)
23	September 9, 2026	7.9% (2nd)	6.7% (2nd)
24	September 10, 2026	7.5% (2nd)	6.2% (2nd)
25	September 11, 2026	6.9% (4th)	5.4% (6th)
26	September 14, 2026	8.0% (2nd)	6.4% (2nd)
27	September 16, 2026	7.2% (3rd)	5.6% (3rd)
28	September 17, 2026	7.4% (2nd)	6.0% (2nd)
29	September 18, 2026	7.7% (2nd)	6.1% (2nd)
30	October 5, 2026	7.1% (3rd)	5.9% (4th)
31	October 6, 2026	6.7% (3rd)	4.9% (3rd)
32	October 7, 2026	7.0% (3rd)	5.3% (4th)
33	October 8, 2026	7.1% (2nd)	5.2% (4th)
34	October 9, 2026	6.8% (3rd)	5.7% (3rd)
35	October 12, 2026	8.0% (2nd)	6.2% (2nd)
36	October 13, 2026	7.8% (2nd)	6.1% (2nd)
37	October 14, 2026	7.8% (2nd)	6.0% (4th)
38	October 15, 2026	7.9% (2nd)	6.4% (2nd)
39	October 16, 2026	7.4% (3rd)	5.5% (5th)
40	October 19, 2026	7.5% (2nd)	6.0% (2nd)
41	October 20, 2026	7.3% (3rd)	5.5% (5th)
42	October 21, 2026	7.2% (2nd)	5.5% (3rd)
43	October 22, 2026	7.1% (3rd)	5.6% (4th)
44	October 23, 2026	6.8% (4th)	5.4% (4th)
45	October 26, 2026	7.5% (3rd)	5.8% (4th)
46	October 28, 2026	7.1% (3rd)	5.3% (4th)
47	October 29, 2026	7.7% (3rd)	6.3% (3rd)
48	October 30, 2026	6.6% (4th)	5.0% (6th)
49	November 2, 2026	7.7% (2nd)	5.8% (2nd)
50	November 3, 2026	7.7% (3rd)	6.2% (4th)
51	November 4, 2026	7.3% (4th)	5.7% (4th)
52	November 5, 2026	7.4% (3rd)	5.7% (4th)
53	November 9, 2026	7.5% (2nd)	6.1% (2nd)
54	November 10, 2026	8.1% (2nd)	6.3% (2nd)
55	November 11, 2026	7.7% (2nd)	5.6% (4th)
56	November 12, 2026	7.7% (2nd)	5.8% (3rd)
57	November 13, 2026	6.9% (3rd)	5.3% (6th)
58	November 16, 2026	8.1% (2nd)	6.3% (2nd)
59	November 17, 2026	8.2% (2nd)	6.4% (2nd)
60	November 18, 2026	8.6% (2nd)	6.9% (2nd)
61	November 19, 2026	8.0% (2nd)	6.4% (3rd)
62	November 20, 2026	7.9% (3rd)	6.2% (4th)
63	November 23, 2026		
64	November 24, 2026		
65	November 25, 2026		
66	November 26, 2026		
67	November 27, 2026		
Average		—	—
In the table above, the blue numbers represent the lowest ratings and the red numbers represent the highest ratings.
