= Princess Bokguk =

Yuan Korean princess (fl. 14th century)

Grand Princess Bokguk 복국장공주 濮國長公主 Пу Гуо Жан гүнж

Consort of Goryeo
- Tenure: 1316 – 8 November 1319
- Coronation: 1316
- Predecessor: Queen Gongwon
- Successor: Princess Joguk
- Born: Borjigin Irinjinbala; Yuan dynasty
- Died: 8 November 1319; Goryeo
- Spouse: Chungsuk of Goryeo (m. 1316–1319)
Names
- Mongolian name: Borjigin Irinjinbala (Боржигин Ринчинбал); Sino-Korean name: Pae'ajigŭn Yŏk'ninjinpal'la (패아지근 역련진팔랄; 孛兒支斤 亦憐眞八剌)
Posthumous name
- Princess Jeonghwa (정화공주; 靖和公主; given on 26 September 1319 by Goryeo); Grand Princess of the Bok State (복국장공주; 濮國長公主; given in 1343 by the Yuan dynasty)
- House: Borjigin (by birth); House of Wang (by marriage)
- Father: Esen Temür

- Princess Bokguk
- Hangul: 복국장공주
- Hanja: 濮國長公主
- RR: Bokguk janggongju
- MR: Pokkuk changgongju

Posthumous name
- Hangul: 정화공주
- Hanja: 靖和公主
- RR: Jeonghwa gongju
- MR: Chŏnghwa kongju

Personal name
- Hangul: 역련진팔랄
- Hanja: 亦憐眞八剌
- RR: Yeongnyeonjin pallal
- MR: Yŏngnyŏnjin p'allal

Grand Princess Bokguk (Korean: 복국장공주; Hanja: 濮國長公主; lit. 'Grand Princess of the Bok State'; d. 8 November 1319) was a Yuan dynasty imperial family member who became a Korean royal consort as the first wife of King Chungsuk of Goryeo. Her personal name was Borjigin Irinjinbala (Mongolian: Боржигин Ринчинбал). She died in 1319, within three years of her wedding.

== Biography ==
When she came to Goryeo in the same year with her marriage in 1316, it was said that she was very jealous of Virtuous Consort Hong due to Hong's closeness with the King. As a result, the Princess did not have a good relationship with the King and often was beaten, which made her bleed from her nose. Three years later, she died and received the posthumous name Princess Jeonghwa (정화공주; 靖和公主).

Two years later, in 1321, Yi Sang-ji (이상지) was sent from Jungseoseong, Yuan dynasty to investigate the Princess's death. At this time, the Princess's servant and some witnesses said:

"Last August, when King Chungsuk and Consort Hong secretly slept together, the Princess eventually became jealous [of them] making her [receive beatings from] the King. This accident [happened often] until sometimes the Princess [bled from] her nose because of this."
(작년 8월 충숙왕과 덕비가 몰래 동침하자 공주가 질투하여 왕이 공주를 구타하였으며, 이때 공주가 코피를 흘렸다. 9월에도 묘련사에 가서 왕이 공주를 구타하는 것을 에센부카(於侁夫介, 어신부개) 등이 말렸다).

For checking the other truth, the Yuans took all of the witnesses. Later, the Goryeo officials (Baek Won-hang (백원항) and Bak Hyo-su (박효수)) claimed their innocence and the investigation narrowly ended. For honour the Princess, the Yuan dynasty gave her the better title as Grand Princess of Bok State (복국장공주; 濮國長公主) in 1343. Meanwhile, she and Chungsuk did not have any issue.

== See also ==
- Goryeo under Mongol rule
