= Namyang Hong clan =

Korean clan in Hwaseong, Gyeonggi Province

- Country: Korea
- Current region: Hwaseong, Gyeonggi
- Founder: Hong Eun yeol
- Connected members: Hong Ah-reum; Hong Ye-ji; Hong Soo-hyun; Hong Soo-ah; Hong Jong-hyun; Hong Beom-do; Namkoong Won; Queen Gongwon; Royal Consort Hwa; Royal Noble Consort Suk; Queen Hyojeong

Namyang Hong clan (Korean: 남양 홍씨; Hanja: 南陽 洪氏) is one of the Korean clans. Their Bon-gwan is in Hwaseong, Gyeonggi, Gyeonggi Province. According to the research held in 2015, the number of Namyang Hong clan members was 487,488.

The Namyang Hong clan is divided into the Dang Hong (남양 홍씨 당홍계, 南陽 洪氏 唐洪系) and the To Hong (남양 홍씨 토홍계, 南陽 洪氏 土洪系) lineages. Although they share the surname Hong and an ancestral seat in Hwaseong's Namyang-eup, and so are grouped together as the Namyang Hong clan, the two lineages do not share a common first ancestor and are not related.

== Dang Hong lineage ==
The Dang Hong lineage of the Namyang Hong clan claims as its progenitor Hong Cheon-ha (홍천하, 洪天河), who was dispatched to Goguryeo as a scholar of the Tang dynasty and settled in the same place as a refugee because of upheaval in the Tang dynasty. The founder of this lineage was Hong Eun-yeol (홍은열, 洪殷悅), who it is claimed descended from Hong Cheon-ha. The clan then originated Namyang-eup, Hwaseong, Gyeonggi Province. This claim about Hong Eun-yeol's line of descent from Hong Cheon-ha has not been substantiated.

Throughout the Goryeo Dynasty, the lineage produced 1 Queen and 2 Royal consorts.

During the Joseon Dynasty, the Dang Hong lineage produced 293 scholars, 8 Sangsin, 2 Munhyeong, 3 Cheongbaekri, 1 Queen, 2 princess consorts, 5 royal consorts, and 4 prince consorts.

In 2000, the Korean census recorded 379,708 members and 117,638 households within the Dang Hong lineage.

== To Hong Lineage ==
Hong Seon-haeng (홍선행, 洪先幸) is the progenitor of the To Hong lineage. The clan originated in Hongbeop-ri, Seosin-myeon, Hwaseong, Gyeonggi Province.

Hong was native of the Dangseong Fortress and served as a guard for the villa of the Goryeo Geumohwi Byeoljangdongjeong (금오위 별장동정, 金吾衛 別將同正) during the Goryeo Dynasty. During the Joseon Dynasty, the To Hong lineage produced 42 scholars in the Department of Literature, 2 Sangsin, 1 Daejehak, 3 Cheongbaekri, 1 prince consort, 1 princess consort and 3 Gongsin.

12-year-old Hong Eon-pil (홍언필, 洪彦弼; 1476-1549) served as Yeonguijeong during the reign of King Jungjong, and married the 6th great-granddaughter of Han Hwak, the father of Queen Sohye.

Hong Eon-pil's son, Hong Seom (홍섬, 洪暹; 1504-1585), also served as Yeonguijeong during the reign of King Seonjo. Hong Seom's daughter, Princess Consort Namyang (남양군부인 홍씨, 南陽郡夫人 洪氏; 1544-1569), married Prince Hawon who was the son of Grand Internal Prince Deokheung, father of King Seonjo. Through Hong Eon-pil’s illegitimate daughter, he became the father-in-law to Queen Jeonghyeon’s nephew.

Hong Eon-gwang (홍언광, 洪彦光), the younger brother of Hong Eon-pil, had a grandson, Hong Hui (홍희, 洪憙), who married Queen Inheon’s older sister. Thus becoming a maternal uncle-in-law to King Injo. Hong Uwŏn, who was a government or administration official, was a member of the clan who fought for Crown Princess Minhoe’s injustice.

These relations and marriages established royal connections early on in the clan.

In 2000, the Korean census recorded 30,662 members and 9,250 households within the To Hong lineage.

== Dang Hong members ==
=== Goryeo Dynasty ===
- Royal Consort Wonbi - King Chungseon's royal consort
- Queen Gongwon - King Chungsuk's Queen consort
- Royal Consort Hwabi - King Chunghye's royal consort

=== Joseon Dynasty ===
- Royal Noble Consort Suk - King Munjong's royal consort
- Royal Consort Suk-ui - King Seongjong's royal consort
- Royal Noble Consort Hui - King Jungjong's royal consort
- Royal Consort Suk-ui - King Jungjong's royal consort
- Royal Noble Consort Jeong - King Seonjo's royal consort
- Queen Hyojeong - King Heonjong's Queen consort
- Princess Consort Gangneung - Grand Prince Pyeongwon's wife, Han Hwak's niece, Queen Sohye’s cousin, and King Sejong's daughter-in-law
- Princess Consort Hong - Prince Jeongpyeong's wife
- Hong Hae - King Taejo's son-in-law and Princess Sukshin's husband
- Hong Yeo - King Jungjong's son-in-law and Princess Hyejeong's husband
- Hong Woo-gyeong - King Seonjo's son-in-law and Princess Jeongin's husband
- Hong Myeong-ha - Princess Jeongsuk's son-in-law and Crown Princess Minhoe's brother-in-law

== See also ==
- Korean clan names of foreign origin
