= Princess Deongnyeong =

Queen consort of Goryeo (fl. 14th century)

Princess Deoknyeong 덕녕공주 德寧公主 Дөнинь гүнж

Queen consort of Goryeo (1st)
- Tenure: 1330–1332
- Coronation: 1330
- Predecessor: Queen Gongwon
- Successor: Queen Gongwon

Queen consort of Goryeo (2nd)
- Tenure: 1339–1344
- Coronation: 1339
- Predecessor: Queen Gongwon
- Successor: Queen Consort Yun

Queen regent of Goryeo
- Tenure / Regency: 1344–1348
- Coronation: 1344
- Monarch: King Chungmok (son)

Queen dowager of Goryeo
- Tenure: ?–15 April 1375
- Predecessor: Queen Dowager Myeongdeok
- Successor: Dynasty abolished (Dowager Queen Jaseong as the first Queen dowager of Joseon)
- Monarch: King Gongmin (brother-in-law)
- Born: Borjigin Irenchenppan; Yuan dynasty
- Died: 15 April 1375; Gaegyeong-bu, Goryeo
- Burial: Gyeongneung Tomb
- Spouse: Chunghye of Goryeo (m. 1330; died 1344)
- Issue: Chungmok of Goryeo; Princess Jangnyeong
Names
- Mongolian name: Borjigin Irinjinbala (Боржигин Ринчинбал); Sino-Korean name: P'aeajigŭn Yŏngninjinban (패아지근 역린진반; 孛兒支斤 亦憐眞班)
Posthumous name
- Princess Jeongsun Sukui (정순숙의공주, 貞順淑儀公主; given by Yuan dynasty in 1367)
- House: Borjigin
- Father: Chopal

- Princess Deongnyeong
- Hangul: 덕녕공주
- Hanja: 德寧公主
- RR: Deongnyeong gongju
- MR: Tŏngnyŏng kongju

Posthumous name
- Hangul: 정순숙의공주
- Hanja: 貞順淑儀公主
- RR: Jeongsunsugui gongju
- MR: Chŏngsunsugŭi kongju

Personal name
- Hangul: 역련진반
- Hanja: 亦憐眞班
- RR: Yeongnyeonjin ban
- MR: Yŏngnyŏnjin pan

Princess Deoknyeong (Korean: 덕녕공주; Hanja: 德寧公主; d. 15 April 1375) was a Yuan Dynasty imperial family member who became a Korean queen consort by her marriage to Chunghye of Goryeo. Following her husband's deposition in 1344, she served as regent for their only son, King Chungmok from 1344 to 1348. She was the third Goryeo queen consort who came from Yuan dynasty to Goryeo. Her personal name was Borjigin Irinjinbala (Mongolian: Боржигин Ринчинбал).

== Biography ==
=== Early life ===
The future Princess Deoknyeong was born in Yuan dynasty with the name Borjigin Irenchenppan (보르지긴 이렌첸빤; 孛兒只斤 亦憐眞班) as the daughter of Chopal.

=== Marriage ===
In 1330, she married Chunghye of Goryeo when he was in Yuan and they later arrived in Goryeo July of the same year. In Goryeo, the King bestowed the "Yeongyeong Palace" (연경궁; 延慶宮) as her residence. Then, in 1337, she gave birth to their first son, the future king Chungmok of Goryeo and also a daughter, Princess Jangnyeong. She followed the Yuan Dynasty custom of marrying Goryeo princes into the family line.

=== Regency ===
In 1344, her husband was deposed and was succeeded by their only son. Due to her son's minority, she became his regent and guardian. At the time of her regency, she led the national army and national affairs on behalf of King Chungmok who was still only eight years old. When Chungmok died without leaving any successor, Chunghye's other son from Consort Yun ascended the throne as King Chungjeong. Although the new king's biological mother was Lady Yun, Princess Deoknyeong was still involved in political affairs as regent, which the King couldn't prevent despite his maternal clan's opposition. Knowing that Yun Si-u (윤시우) and Bae Jeon (배전) formed a dominant force which caused political disturbances, Deoknyeong formally stepped down as regent in 1348. Then, in 1350, the first Japanese Invasion occurred and King Chungjeong was dethroned one year later in 1351.

=== Later life ===
Even after the appointment of King Gongmin, she was treated with great hospitality in Goryeo and become the Queen Mother. In 1367, her homeland gave her the Imperial title as Princess Jeongsunsugui (정순숙의공주; 貞順淑儀公主) and she died on 15 April 1375. Her tomb is known as "Gyeongneung Tomb" (경릉; 頃陵).

== In popular culture ==
- Portrayed by Kim Yeo-jin in the 2005–2006 MBC TV series Shin Don.

== See also ==
- Goryeo under Mongol rule
