= Princess Euncheon =

Goryeo royal consort (fl. 14th century)

Princess Euncheon 은천옹주

Royal consort of Goryeo
- Tenure: 1340–1343
- Coronation: 1340
- Predecessor: Splendid Consort Hong
- Successor: Princess Gyeonghwa
- Spouse: Chunghye of Goryeo (m. 1340–1343)
- Issue: Wang Seok-gi
Regnal name
- Palace Lady Im (궁인 임씨; 宮人 林氏; from 1340); Princess Sagi (사기옹주; 沙器翁主); Princess Oji (오지옹주)
- Father: Im-Sin

Princess Euncheon of the Im clan (Korean: 은천옹주 임씨; Hanja: 銀川翁主 林氏) or Princess Sagi (사기옹주; 沙器翁主) was a Korean royal consort and the 4th wife of King Chunghye of Goryeo. She was also known as Princess Oji (오지옹주).

== Biography ==
=== Early life and background ===
The future Princess Euncheon was born as the daughter of merchant Im-Sin (임신) who served Grand Prince Danyang, a grandson of Chungnyeol of Goryeo. While she and her father made their living by selling porcelain vessels, she was found and favored not long after by King Chunghye, also becoming his concubine and favourite wife.

=== Palace life ===
In 1340, Princess Euncheon then entered the palace by Chunghye's order and become Palace Lady Im (궁인 임씨; 宮人 林氏) and two years later, in February, Lady Hong was chosen to become Chunghye's 3rd wife and was given a royal title. Seeing this, Im became jealous and tried to prevent the marriage. To comfort her, the King then bestowed the royal title Princess Euncheon unto her. However, people had also referred to Princess Euncheon as Princess Sagi (which came from her times selling porcelain vessels) and Princess Oji.

It was said that King Chunghye usually took an energized drug called Yeoryak (열약), and after contracting its effects while he was still a crown prince in the Yuan Dynasty, passed the effects on to the women he spent nights with. At this time, no one had been able to handle the King's energy or suffer from the drug's effects, but Princess Euncheon was able to handle him, making the King love her more. When she gave birth to their son, the King robbed the linen and silk market and gave its goods to her as a gift. She was said to be very lustful and got along well with the King. It was known that she had a taste for luxury, which caused her to tell the King to build a new palace for her to live in.

In 1343, the King gave foods to the crowds that were mobilized for her new palace's construction and gave them awards. In the process, by Princess Euncheon's order, many millstones and treadmills were installed. However, in November of the same year, the Yuan Dynasty captured King Chunghye, ending her luxurious life under the king's oversight. After he was taken away, she and about 120 other royal officials who were on the King's side were immediately expelled from the palace. There were no records left after her expulsion from the palace.
