= Princess Gyeonghwa =

Yuan Korean queen consort (fl. 14th century)

Princess Gyeonghwa 경화공주 慶華公主 Цинхуа гүнж

Queen consort of Goryeo
- Tenure: 1333–1339
- Coronation: 1333
- Predecessor: Princess Joguk
- Successor: Princess Deoknyeong
- Monarch: King Chungsuk

Royal consort of Goryeo
- Tenure: ?–1344
- Predecessor: Royal Consort Im
- Monarch: King Chunghye
- Born: Bayankhutag; Yuan dynasty
- Died: 24 July 1344; Goryeo
- Burial: 1344; Unknown
- Spouse: Chungsuk of Goryeo (before 1339) Chunghye of Goryeo (before 1344)
Names
- Mongolian name: Borjigin Bayan Khutuk (Боржигин Баянхутаг); Sino-Korean name: Baekanholdo (백안홀도; 伯顔忽都)
Posthumous name
- Princess Sukgong Hwiryeong (숙공휘령공주, 肅恭徽寧公主; given by Yuan dynasty in 1367); Princess Baek'anholdo (백안홀도공주, 伯顔忽都公主)
- House: House of Wang (by marriage)
- Father: Amuga (disputed)

- Princess Gyeonghwa
- Hangul: 경화공주
- Hanja: 慶華公主
- RR: Gyeonghwa gongju
- MR: Kyŏnghwa kongju

Posthumous name
- Hangul: 숙공휘령공주
- Hanja: 肅恭徽寧公主
- RR: Sukgong hwiryeong gongju
- MR: Sukkong hwiryŏng kongju

Personal name
- Hangul: 백안홀도
- Hanja: 伯顔忽都
- RR: Baegan holdo
- MR: Paegan holdo

Bayankhutag (Mongolian: Баянхутаг; Middle Mongolian: ᠪᠠᠶᠠᠨᠺᠣᠲᠣᠭ), more commonly known by her Korean royal title as Princess Gyeonghwa (Korean: 경화공주; Hanja: 慶華公主; d. 24 July 1344) was a Yuan dynasty woman who became a Korean royal consort as the third wife of King Chungsuk of Goryeo. After his death, she was raped by her stepson, and thus she was forced to marry him.

== Biography ==
=== Background ===
Mysteries surround Bayankhutag's lineage, but since the "Baekan clan" (백안; 伯顔) were nobles at that time, it was believed that she was born into the noble family. Masahiko Morihira has suggested that she was the sister or half-sister of Princess Joguk, King Chungsuk's wife. After her sister's death in 1325, Bayankhutag married her sister's husband, probably between 1330 and 1333 when the King stayed in Yuan dynasty and not long after that they two went back to Goryeo.

=== Assault ===
King Chungsuk died in 1339, after which Bayankhutag stayed in Goryeo. The Goryeosa records that, during a meal in her apartments one night, her stepson, Chunghye of Goryeo, got drunk and raped her. The next day, Bayankhutag attempted to flee to the Yuan ambassador for help to leave Goryeo, but Chunghye issued a ban on horses in the city, so she could not leave. He then had her imprisoned in Yeongnak Palace (영락궁; 永樂宮), told the court that she was ill, and posted guards around her apartments. The Yuan emissary eventually visited the palace and insisted that Bayankhutag be released and Chunghye take her as a consort.

As consort, Bayankhutag is recorded to have offered advice in choosing officials in the Yuan Goryeo government. She died in 1344. In 1367, she received her posthumous name from the Yuan dynasty.

=== Later life and death ===
King Chunghye died in 1344 while on the road to exile and Bayankhutag then died not long after that. Her funeral was held on 18th days 9th months (Lunar calendar) in the same year and gave her new title as Princess Gyeonghwa (경화공주; 慶華公主). Later, in 1367, the Yuan dynasty bestowed royal title Princess Sukgong Hwiryeong (숙공휘령공주; 肅恭徽寧公主) as her posthumous name.

== In popular culture ==
- Portrayed by Ryu Hyun-kyung in the 2013–2014 MBC TV series Empress Ki.

== See also ==
- Goryeo under Mongol rule
