= Hwangju Byun clan =

Korean clan from Hwanghae Province

Hwangju Byeon clan
- Country: Korea
- Current region: Hwangju County
- Founder: Byeon Ryeo
- Connected members: Byun Hee-bong; Kyunyeo

Hwangju Byeon clan (Korean: 황주 변씨; Hanja: 黃州 邊氏) was one of the Korean clans. Their Bon-gwan was in Hwangju County, Hwanghae Province. According to the research in 2015, the number of Hwangju Byeon clan was 8037. Their founder was Byeon Ryeo. He was from Longxi Commandery, China. After Song dynasty collapsed, he was naturalized in Goryeo and settled in Hwangju.

== See also ==
- Korean clan names of foreign origin
