= Chungmok of Goryeo =

King of Goryeo from 1344 to 1348

Chungmok 충목왕 忠穆王

King of Goryeo
- Reign: 1344–1348
- Coronation: 1344
- Predecessor: Chunghye of Goryeo
- Successor: Chungjeong of Goryeo

Prince of Shen(Sim) of Yang
- Reign: 1345–1348
- Coronation: 1345
- Predecessor: Wang Ko
- Successor: Chungjeong of Goryeo
- Born: Wang Hŭn; 15 May 1337
- Died: 25 December 1348 (aged 11)
- Burial: Myeongneung (명릉; 明陵)
Names
- Goryeo: Wang Heun (왕흔; 王昕); Yuan: Batma Dorji (파드마도르지/바스마도르지, 八思麻朶兒只)
Posthumous name
- Great King Hyeonhyo (현효대왕, 顯孝大王; given by Goryeo dynasty); King Chungmok (충목왕, 忠穆王; given by Yuan dynasty)
- House: Wang
- Dynasty: Goryeo
- Father: Chunghye of Goryeo
- Mother: Princess Deoknyeong
- Religion: Buddhism

Korean name
- Hangul: 왕흔
- Hanja: 王昕
- RR: Wang Heun
- MR: Wang Hŭn

Monarch name
- Hangul: 충목왕
- Hanja: 忠穆王
- RR: Chungmogwang
- MR: Ch'ungmogwang

Chungmok (15 May 1337 – 25 December 1348, r. 1344–1348), born Wang Hŭn (Korean: 왕흔; Hanja: 王昕), was the 29th king of the Goryeo Dynasty of Korea.

== Biography ==
He was the eldest son of King Chunghye, and his mother was Princess Deoknyeong. Chungmok is known in some records by his Mongolian name, Batma Dorji, which is rendered in hanja as Palsamataaji (팔사마타아지; 八思麻朶兒只).

After King Chunghye was deposed in 1343, King Chungmok had an audience with the Yuan Emperor Togon-temür. He was asked whether he would prefer to follow the ways of his mother or his father; when King Chungmok answered that he would prefer to follow his mother, the Emperor said that this was a child who knew the difference between right and wrong, and made him king. During Chungmok's reign, the Goryeo government undertook several reforms to reverse the damage done by his predecessor, and abolished various government agencies that had harmed the people. He died only four years into his reign at the age of 12.

== Family ==
- Father: Chunghye of Goryeo
  - Grandfather: Chungsuk of Goryeo
  - Grandmother: Queen Gongwon of the Namyang Hong clan
- Mother: Princess Deoknyeong of the Yuan Borjigin clan, personal name Irenchenppan.
  - Grandfather: Chopal

== In popular culture ==
- Portrayed by Min Byung-hyun in the 2005–2006 MBC TV series Shin Don.

== See also ==
- List of Korean monarchs
- Goryeo
- Korea under Yuan rule

Chungmok of Goryeo House of Wang Born: 15 May 1337 Died: 25 December 1348
Regnal titles
Preceded by King Chunghye	King of Goryeo; 1344–1348	Succeeded by King Chungjeong
