= Chungjeong of Goryeo =

King of Goryeo from 1349 to 1351

Chungjeong 충정왕 忠定王
- Internal Prince Gyeongchang (경창부원군; 慶昌府院君)

King of Goryeo
- Reign: 1349–1351
- Coronation: 1349
- Predecessor: Chungmok of Goryeo
- Successor: Gongmin of Goryeo

Prince of Shen(Sim) of Yang
- Reign: 1348–1351
- Coronation: 1348
- Predecessor: Wang Heun
- Successor: Wang Toghtuabukha
- Born: Wang Jeo; January 9, 1338
- Died: March 23, 1352 (aged 14)
- Burial: Chongneung (총릉; 聰陵)
- Issue: Wang Je (Note: Wang Je does not appear in either the Goryeosa or Goryeosa Jeolyo. He only appears in the "Family Genealogy of the Wang clan of Gaeseong" (개성 왕씨 족보), so many debate his existence.)
Names
- Goryeo: Wang Jeo (왕저; 王㫝); Yuan: Chosgen Dorji (초스건도르지/미사감타아지, 迷思監朶兒只)
Posthumous name
- Great King Chungjeong (충정대왕; 忠定大王)
- House: Wang
- Dynasty: Goryeo
- Father: Chunghye of Goryeo
- Mother: Royal Consort Hui
- Religion: Buddhism

Korean name
- Hangul: 왕저
- Hanja: 王㫝
- RR: Wang Jeo
- MR: Wang Chŏ

Monarch name
- Hangul: 충정왕
- Hanja: 忠定王
- RR: Chungjeongwang
- MR: Ch'ungjŏngwang

Chungjeong (9 January 1338 – 23 March 1352, r. 1348–1351), born Wang Jeo (왕저; 王㫝), also known by his Mongolian name Chosgen Dorji (迷思監朶兒只), was the 30th ruler of the Goryeo dynasty of Korea. He was enthroned at the age of 12. He reigned as King of Goryeo from 2 June 1349 – 3 November 1351, and was deposed by order of the Yuan dynasty Emperor of China at the request of Yun Taek, Yi Seung-ro, and several other Korean nobles. Chungjeong's uncle, Grand Prince Wang Ji, was enthroned as King Gongmin of Goryeo. Chungjeong was banished to Ganghwa Island, where he died less than five months later, after being poisoned, on 23 March 1352.

== Biography ==
During King Chungjeong's brief reign, the politics of the court were controlled by powerful relatives of the royal family, including his mother's relative Yun Si-u and the retainer Bae Jeon. In addition, the country endured heavy Wokou raids beginning in 1349.

King Chungjeong's uncle Wang Gi secured imperial favor and married a Yuan daughter, Princess Noguk. Shortly thereafter King Chungjeong was deposed, and Wang Gi ascended the throne as King Gongmin.

== Family ==
- Father: Chunghye of Goryeo
  - Grandfather: Chungsuk of Goryeo
  - Grandmother: Queen Gongwon of the Namyang Hong clan
- Mother: Royal Consort Hui of the Papyeong Yun clan
  - Grandfather: Yun Gye-jong
  - Grandmother: Lady, of the Yeoheung Min clan (부인 여흥 민씨)
- Illegitimate son: Wang Je (왕제)

== In popular culture ==
- Portrayed by Choi Young-joo in the 2005–2006 MBC TV series Shin Don.
- Portrayed by Choi Won-hong in the 2012 SBS TV series Faith.

== See also ==
- List of Korean monarchs
- Goryeo
- Korea under Yuan rule

== Notes ==
Chungjeong of Goryeo House of Wang Born: 1338 Died: 23 March 1352
Regnal titles
Preceded by King Chungmok	King of Goryeo; 1348–1351	Succeeded by King Gongmin
