= Lee Sun-young (announcer) =

South Korean television personality

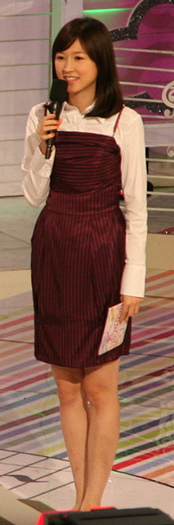

Lee Sun Young (Hangul: 이선영; born February 22, 1982) is a Korean announcer for the Korean Broadcasting System. She is widely known for announcing sports in the program 'KBS Today Sports'. She specializes in sports and was a sportscaster for the 2006 Asian Games held in Doha but also appears in the hit program 'Vitamin'.
