= Queen Gongwon =

Goryeo Queen Dowager (1298–1380)

Queen Gongwon 공원왕후

Consort of Goryeo
- Tenure: 1313–1330
- Predecessor: Princess Gyeguk
- Successor: Princess Deongnyeong
- Tenure: 1332–1339
- Predecessor: Princess Deongnyeong
- Successor: Princess Deongnyeong

Dowager Consort of Goryeo
- Tenure: 1339–1344
- Predecessor: Dowager Consort Gim
- Successor: Dowager Consort An
- Monarch: Chunghye (son)

(Royal) Queen Dowager of Goryeo
- Tenure: 1351–1380
- Predecessor: Queen Dowager Wondeok
- Successor: Dynasty abolished: Princess Deongnyeong as the Queen Regent of Goryeo; Queen Dowager Sundeok as the first Queen Dowager of Joseon; Royal Queen Dowager Jaseong as the first Royal Queen Dowager of Joseon
- Monarch: Gongmin (son; 1351–1372); U (grandson; 1372–1380)
- Born: 25 August 1298; Goryeo
- Died: 12 February 1380 (aged 81); Goryeo
- Burial: Yeongneung Mausoleum
- Spouse: Chungsuk of Goryeo (m. 1313; died 1339)
- Issue: Chunghye of Goryeo; Gongmin of Goryeo
Regnal name
- Virtuous Consort Hong (Deokbi Hong; 덕비 홍씨, 德妃 洪氏; from 1313); Dowager Consort Hong (Daebi Hong; 대비 홍씨, 大妃 洪氏); Queen Dowager Myeongdeok (Myeongdeok Taehu; 명덕태후, 明德太后); Royal Queen Dowager Sunggyeong (Sunggyeong Wangtaehu; 숭경왕태후, 崇敬王太后)
Posthumous name
- Gongwon (공원; 恭元; lit. '"Reverent and Primary"')
- Clan: Namyang Hong clan (by birth); Gaeseong Wang clan (by marriage)
- Dynasty: House of Wang (by marriage)
- Father: Hong Gyu
- Mother: Lady Gim

Queen Gongwon of the Namyang Hong clan (Korean: 공원왕후 홍씨; Hanja: 恭元王后 洪氏; 25 August 1298 – 12 February 1380 (Note: According to the lunar calendar, she was born on the 18th day of the 7th month of 1298 and died on the 6th day of the 1st month of 1380.)), more commonly known as Queen Dowager Myeongdeok (명덕태후; 明德太后), was a Korean royal consort as the fourth wife of King Chungsuk of Goryeo and the mother of his two successors, Chunghye and Gongmin.

== Biography ==
=== Early life and background ===
The future Queen Gongwon was born on 25 August 1298 into the Namyang Hong clan as the fifth daughter of Hong Gyu. Her mother was a woman from the Gwangju Gim clan. Lady Sunhwa, King Chungseon's fifth wife, was one of her elder sisters.

=== Marriage and palace life ===
In 1313, she married King Chungsuk and was promoted to Consort Deok (덕비; 德妃), while her biological parents were given the honorary titles of Internal Prince Namyang (남양부원군) and Grand Madame of Gwangju County (광주군대부인). She was rumored to be intelligent and tidy when she was young, and after entering the palace, it was said that she followed the etiquette carefully and was loved by the king.

In 1315, she gave birth to her first son, Wang Jeong. Although she was the king's first wife, Goryeo kings had to marry Yuan imperial women, so she had to move into Duke Jeongan's manor. However, the king left the palace every night to meet her, which made Yilianzhenbala, the Yuan princess, hate Lady Hong badly.

In 1318, Lady Hong, the king and the princess went to Yeongyeong Palace (연경궁; 延慶宮) to enjoy a banquet. At this time, when the king approached Lady Hong, Yilianzhenbala felt jealous and fought with him. The fight eventually escalated and he hit her. Yilianzhenbala suddenly died a year later and subsequently, the other Yuan princess, Jintong, also died during childbirth. Thus, the relationship between the king and Lady Hong deepened. In 1330, she gave birth to their second son, Wang Gi.

Not long after this, the king abdicated the throne to Wang Jeong and their relationship began to crack little by little; finally, he expelled to her hometown and banned her from meeting their son. In 1332, Lady Hong was restored and she returned to Gaegyeong.

=== Two sons' reign ===
During King Chunghye's reign, her residence was called as Deokgyeong Mansion (덕경부; 德慶府), but the name was changed into Munye Mansion (문예부; 文睿府) during King Gongmin's reign. Also under his command, she was elevated to Dowager Consort (대비; 大妃) and later received the new honorary name, Royal Queen Dowager Sungyeong (숭경왕태후; 崇敬王太后) while stayed in Sungyeong Mansion (숭경부; 崇敬府).

She was in a confrontation with Sin Don and frequently made remarks about the radical reform policies of Gongmin. In particular, when she saw him executing several officials who were obstacles to the policies, she reproached him. When Sin Don was executed, her relationship with her son improved.

After Gongmin's death, her grandson ascended the throne as King U. In 1376, the boy's biological mother, a slave belonging to Sin Don called Banya, snuck into her residence to protest the fact that she was not acknowledged as the king's mother. Lady Hong drove the woman out, and later had her thrown into the Imjin River.

=== Death ===
Lady Hong lived for another 40 years after her husband's death, dying on 12 February 1380 (6th year reign of King U's reign) at 81 years old. She then received her posthumous name and was buried in the Yeongneung Mausoleum (영릉; 令陵). Until 1391, her ancestral rites were held alongside those of King Chungjeong's biological mother, Lady Yun. Shortly after her death, her relatives and supporters, such as Gyeong Bok-heung (경복흥), were immediately purged.

== Family ==
- Father
  - Hong Gyu (홍규; 洪奎; 1242–1316)
- Mother
  - Biological: Lady Gim of the Gwangju Gim clan, Grand Madame of Gwangju County (광주군대부인 김씨; 光州郡大夫人 金氏; 1258–1339)
  - Stepmother: Lady Im of the Jincheon Im clan (진천 임씨; 鎭川 林氏)
- Sibling(s)
  - Older brother: Hong Yung (홍융; 洪戒)
  - Older sister: Lady Hong (홍씨; 洪氏)
  - Older sister: Lady Hong (홍씨; 洪氏)
  - Older sister: Lady Sunhwa, Consort Hong of the Namyang Hong clan (순화원비 홍씨; 順和院妃 洪氏; ? – 1306)
    - Brother-in-law: King Chungseon of Goryeo (고려 충선왕; 1275–1325)
  - Older sister: Lady Hong (홍씨; 洪氏)
- Husband: Wang Man, King Chungsuk (충숙 왕만; 31 July 1294 – 3 May 1339)
  - Father-in-law: Wang Jang, King Chungseon (충선 왕장; 20 October 1275 – 23 June 1325)
  - Mother-in-law: Yaksokjin, Consort Ui (의비 야속진; ? – 6 August 1316)
- Issue
  - Son: Wang Jeong, King Chunghye (충혜 왕정; 22 February 1315 – 30 January 1344)
  - Son: Wang Gi/Jeon, King Gongmin (공민 왕기/전; 23 May 1330 – 27 October 1374)

== In popular culture ==
- Portrayed by Uhm Yoo-shin in the 2005–2006 MBC TV series Sin Don.
- Portrayed by Kim Chung in the 2012–2013 SBS TV series The Great Seer.
- Portrayed by Lee Duk-hee in the 2014 KBS1 TV series Jeong Do-jeon.
