= Princess Joguk =

Korean royal consort (1308–1325)

Grand Princess Joguk 조국장공주 曹國長公主 Цо Гуо Жан гүнж

Consort of Goryeo
- Tenure: 1324–1325
- Coronation: 1324
- Predecessor: Princess Bokguk
- Successor: Princess Gyeonghwa
- Born: Borjigin Jintong; 1308; Great Yuan
- Died: 26 November 1325 (aged about 16/17); Yongsan, Hanyang, Goryeo
- Spouse: Chungsuk of Goryeo (m. 1325–1325)
- Issue: Heir Successor Yongsan
Names
- Mongolian name: Borjigin Jintong (Боржигин Жинтун); Sino-Korean name: Pae'ajigŭn Gŭmdong (Korean: 패아지근 금동; Hanja: 孛兒支斤 金童)
- House: Borjigin (by birth); House of Wang (by marriage)
- Father: Amuga

- Princess Joguk
- Hangul: 조국장공주
- Hanja: 曹國長公主
- Revised Romanization: Joguk Janggongju
- McCune–Reischauer: Choguk Changgongju

Birth name
- Hangul: 금동
- Hanja: 金童
- Revised Romanization: Geumdong
- McCune–Reischauer: Kŭmdong

Grand Princess Joguk (Korean: 조국장공주; Hanja: 曹國長公主; lit. 'Grand Princess of the State of Jo'; 1308 – 26 November 1325) was a Yuan dynasty imperial family member who became a Korean royal consort as the second wife of King Chungsuk of Goryeo. Her personal name was Borjigin Jintong (Mongolian: Боржигин Жинтун).

== Biography ==
=== Early life ===
The future Princess Joguk was born in 1308 in the Yuan dynasty as the daughter of Amuga and the granddaughter of Darmabala, also the sister of Bayankhutag.

=== Marriage ===
In 1325, she married King Chungsuk who was 14 years older than her in Beijing and when they arrived in Goryeo, they go to Yongsan, Hanyang where she gave birth to their son, Heir Successor Yongsan. Not long after that, the Princess died in the Goryeo Royal Palace in Yongsan at the young age (about 16,7). Then, the Yuans sent Tal Pil-al (탈필알; 脫必歹) to take care about her ancestral rites.

=== Later life ===
In the following year, in 1343, the reign Yuan Emperor Toghon Temür gave her the Yuan Imperial Title Grand Princess Joguk (조국장공주; 曹國長公主) for her posthumous name. The future King Gongmin's primary wife, Princess Noguk was Joguk's niece.

== See also ==
- Goryeo under Mongol rule
