= Chunghye of Goryeo =

King of Goryeo (1330–32; 1339–43)

Chunghye 충혜왕 忠惠王

King of Goryeo 1st reign
- Reign: 1330–1332
- Coronation: 1330
- Predecessor: Chungsuk of Goryeo
- Successor: Chungsuk of Goryeo

King of Goryeo 2nd reign
- Reign: 1339–1343
- Coronation: 1339
- Predecessor: Chungsuk of Goryeo
- Successor: Chungmok of Goryeo
- Born: Wang Chŏng; 22 February 1315; Gaegyeong, Goryeo
- Died: 30 January 1344 (aged 28); Yueyang, Yuan dynasty
- Burial: Yeongneung (영릉; 永陵)
- Spouse: Princess Deoknyeong (m. 1330–1344) Consort Hui (before 1380) Consort Hwa (m. 1342–1344) Princess Euncheon (m. 1340; deposed 1343) Princess Gyeonghwa (before 1344)
- Issue: Chungmok of Goryeo; Chungjeong of Goryeo; Wang Seokgi; Princess Jangnyeong
Names
- Goryeo: Wang Chŏng (왕정; 王禎); Yuan: Putashiri (부다시리; 寶塔失里)
Posthumous name
- Great King Heonhyo (헌효대왕, 獻孝大王; given by Goryeo dynasty); King Chunghye (충혜왕, 忠惠王; given by Yuan dynasty)
- House: Wang
- Dynasty: Goryeo
- Father: Chungsuk of Goryeo
- Mother: Queen Gongwon
- Religion: Buddhism

Korean name
- Hangul: 왕정
- Hanja: 王禎
- RR: Wang Jeong
- MR: Wang Chŏng

Monarch name
- Hangul: 충혜왕
- Hanja: 忠惠王
- RR: Chunghyewang
- MR: Ch'unghyewang

Chunghye (22 February 1315 – 30 January 1344, r. 1330–1332, 1340–1344), personal name Wang Chŏng (Korean: 왕정; Hanja: 王禎), was the 28th king of the Goryeo dynasty of Korea.

== Biography ==
He was remembered in the Goryeosa for his licentious lifestyle, particularly his habit of abducting, raping, and killing women. King Chunghye was the son of King Chungsuk of Goryeo and Queen Gongwon, a Hong. He is sometimes known by his Mongolian name, Putashiri, which is rendered in hanja as Put'apsilri (보탑실리; 寶塔實里).

King Chunghye travelled to the Yuan Dynasty in 1328. In 1330, then-king King Chungsuk petitioned to abdicate the throne, and the emperor sent King Chunghye back to Goryeo to assume the throne. But in the following year, King Chungsuk returned to the throne and King Chunghye returned to China. In 1339, King Chungsuk died. One faction supported the noble Wang Go's claim to the throne, but their attempted coup failed and King Chunghye's reign was restored. King Chunghye's queen was Princess Deoknyeong, who gave birth to King Chungmok.

After his father's death, Chunghye raped one of his father's concubines, Princess Gyeonghwa, who attempted to flee Goryeo. Chunghye imprisoned her in the palace. The Yuan emissary eventually visited the palace to visit Princess Gyeonghwa, who informed him of what had transpired. Then, the Yuan emissary arrested Chunghye and dragged Chunghye to Beijing. Initially, Goryeo officials held debates on whether or not to rescue Chunghye, but many Goryeo officials deliberately delayed on their decision making due to how widely hated he was by the Goryeo court. Chunghye was dethroned, forced to remain in the court of the Yuan Dynasty, and his son ascended the throne of Goryeo.

== Family ==
- Father: Chungsuk of Goryeo
  - Grandfather: Chungseon of Goryeo
  - Grandmother: Consort Ui
- Mother: Queen Gongwon of the Namyang Hong clan
  - Grandfather: Hong Gyu
  - Grandmother: Grand Lady of Samhan State of the Gwangju Kim clan (삼한국대부인 광주 김씨)
- Consorts and their Respective Issue(s):
1. Princess Deoknyeong of the Yuan Borjigin clan, personal name Irenchenppan.
  1. Crown Prince Wang Heun, 1st son
  2. Princess Jangnyeong, 1st daughter
2. Royal Consort Hui of the Papyeong Yun clan
  1. Wang Jeo, 2nd son
3. Royal Consort Hwa of the Namyang Hong clan – No issue.
4. Princess Euncheon of the Im clan
  1. Wang Seok-gi, 3rd son
5. Bayankhutag, Princess Gyeonghwa (d. 1344) – No issue.

== In popular culture ==
- Portrayed by Oh Hyeon-cheol in the 2012 SBS TV series Faith.
- Portrayed by Joo Jin-mo and Ahn Do-gyu in the 2013–2014 MBC TV series Empress Ki.
- Portrayed by Lee Deok-hee in the 2014 KBS1 TV series Jeong Do-jeon.

== See also ==
- List of Korean monarchs
- Goryeo politics
- Korea under Yuan rule

Chunghye of Goryeo House of Wang Born: 22 February 1315 Died: 30 January 1344
Regnal titles
Preceded by King Chungsuk	King of Goryeo; 1330–1332	Succeeded by King Chungsuk
Preceded by King Chungsuk	King of Goryeo; 1339–1344	Succeeded by King Chungmok
