= Yasokjin =

Goryeo consort

Ui-Bi 의비
- Royal consort of Goryeo
- Born: Unknown; Yuan Empire
- Died: 18th day 7th month 1316; Khanbaliq, Yuan Empire
- Burial: 20th day 8th month 1316; Yeonneung Tomb, Kingdom of Goryeo
- Spouse: Chungseon of Goryeo
- Issue: Prince Gwangneung; Chungsuk of Goryeo
Names
- Mongolian: Yesüčing (Есүчин); Korean: Yasokjin (야속진; 也速眞)
Posthumous name
- Consort Ui (의비, 懿妃)
- House: House of Wang (by marriage)

- Korean name
- Hangul: 야속진
- Hanja: 也速眞
- Revised Romanization: Yasokjin
- McCune–Reischauer: Yasokch'in

Posthumous name
- Hangul: 의비
- Hanja: 懿妃
- Revised Romanization: Ui Bi
- McCune–Reischauer: Ŭi Pi

Yasokjin, Consort Ui (Korean: 야속진 의비; Hanja: 也速眞 懿妃; died 1316), born Yesüčing (Mongolian: Есүчин), was a Mongol-born woman who became the second wife of King Chungseon of Goryeo. Although she was an ethnic Mongol, she was not a member of the Yuan imperial clan. As her second son was born in 1294, it seems like she became Chungseon's consort before that. She died in 1316 (3rd year of her son's reign) whilst in Yuan. On her death, she was granted the posthumous name of Royal Consort Ui, by which she was more commonly known.

== Burial and funeral ==
As the preparations for Yasokjin's burial had not been completed in Goryeo, her body was cremated and buried in Yuan by the Goryeo official Kim Yi (Korean: 김이; Hanja: 金怡), who visited her grave every month to present offerings of meat and wine. After three years, the King wanted to move his mother to a burial site on West Mountain near Khanbaliq, a move that Kim opposed. Kim then paid a diviner to tell the King that if one is enshrined in one's own country, there will be no disaster later.' Her body then brought to Goryeo on 3rd days 8th months (Lunar calendar) and her funeral was held on 20th days 8th months (Lunar calendar). The King was persuaded and had Yasokjin's ashes returned to Goryeo, then buried at Yeolleung (연릉, 衍陵) which the preparation of the tomb is 3 years after her death. Her spirit was through "Cheongun Temple" (청운사, 靑雲寺) and was enshrined in "Myoryeon Temple" (묘련사, 妙蓮寺).
