= Chungsuk of Goryeo =

King of Goryeo (1313–30; 1332–39)

King Chungsuk 충숙왕 忠肅王

King of Goryeo 1st reign
- Reign: 1313–1330
- Coronation: 1313
- Predecessor: Chungseon of Goryeo
- Successor: Chunghye of Goryeo

King of Goryeo 2nd reign
- Reign: 1332–1339
- Coronation: 1332
- Predecessor: Chunghye of Goryeo
- Successor: Chunghye of Goryeo
- Born: Wang To; 30 July 1294; Goryeo
- Died: 3 May 1339 (aged 44); Gaegyeong, Goryeo
- Burial: Uireung (의릉; 毅陵)
- Consort: Queen Gongwon (m. 1313–1339) Princess Bokguk (m. 1316; died 1319) Princess Joguk (m. 1325; died 1325) Princess Gyeonghwa (before 1339)
- Issue: Chunghye of Goryeo; Gongmin of Goryeo; Prince Yongsan
Names
- Goryeo: Wang To (왕도; 王燾), later Wang Man (왕만; 王卍); Yuan: Aratnashiri (아라트나시리/아랄특눌실리, 阿剌忒訥失里)
Posthumous name
- Great King Uihyo (의효대왕, 懿孝大王; given by Goryeo dynasty); King Chungsuk (충숙왕, 忠肅王; given by Yuan dynasty)
- House: Wang
- Dynasty: Goryeo
- Father: Chungseon of Goryeo
- Mother: Yasokjin, Consort Ui
- Religion: Buddhism

Korean name
- Hangul: 왕도
- Hanja: 王燾
- RR: Wang Do
- MR: Wang To

Monarch name
- Hangul: 충숙왕
- Hanja: 忠肅王
- RR: Chungsugwang
- MR: Ch'ungsugwang

Chungsuk (30 July 1294 – 3 May 1339), personal name Wang Man (Korean: 왕만; Hanja: 王卍), né Wang To (Korean: 왕도; Hanja: 王燾), also known by his Mongolian name Aratnashiri (阿剌忒訥失里), was the 27th king of the Goryeo Dynasty of Korea, reigning from 1313 to 1330 and again from 1332 to 1339.

== Biography ==
In 1314 King Chungseon passed the throne to his son King Chungsuk. In 1321 King Chungsuk fathered his son King Chunghye. This prompted the previous crown prince of Goryeo, Öljeyitü, to establish an alliance with Emperor Sidibala, and King Chungsuk was thus interned in 1321. However, Sidibala was assassinated in 1323 and Öljeitü's plan was aborted.

King Chungsuk, who was allowed to return to Goryeo in 1325, passed the throne to King Chunghye in 1330 but was reinstated after two years because King Chunghye was deposed by Yuan dynasty. Letters uncovered from the Vatican potentially suggest that the first contacts between the Vatican and Korea began during Chungsuk's reign, 261 years before Spanish Catholic priest Gregorio de Céspedes visited Joseon, the successor state of Goryeo, though some Korean researchers believe the letters could potentially have been forgeries. On December 13, 1335, after having a dream, the King changed his personal name from To (도; 燾) to Man (만; 卍).

King Chungsuk died in 1339.

== Family ==
- Father: Chungseon of Goryeo
  - Grandfather: Chungnyeol of Goryeo
  - Grandmother: Queen Jangmok of the Yuan Borjigin clan
- Mother: Consort Ui
- Consorts and their Respective Issue(s):
1. Grand Princess of Bok State of the Yuan Borjigin clan, personal name Yilianzhenbala – No issue.
2. Grand Princess of Jo State of the Yuan Borjigin clan, personal name Jintong.
  1. Heir Successor Yongsan, 2nd son
3. Princess Gyeonghwa, personal name Bayankhutag – No issue.
4. Queen Gongwon of the Namyang Hong clan
  1. Crown Prince Wang Jeong, 1st son
  2. Wang Ki, Grand Prince Gangneung, 3rd son
5. Royal Consort Su of the Andong Kwon clan – No issue.

== In popular culture ==
- Portrayed by Lee Jung-gil in the 2005 MBC Mini series Jikji.
- Portrayed by Kwon Tae-won in the 2013–2014 MBC TV series Empress Ki.

== See also ==
- List of Goryeo people
- History of Korea
- Korea under Yuan rule

Chungsuk of Goryeo House of Wang Born: 30 July 1294 Died: 3 May 1339
Regnal titles
Preceded by King Chungseon	King of Goryeo; 1313–1330	Succeeded by King Chunghye
Preceded by King Chunghye	King of Goryeo; 1332–1339	Succeeded by King Chunghye
