= Park Yu-rim =

South Korean actress (born 1993)

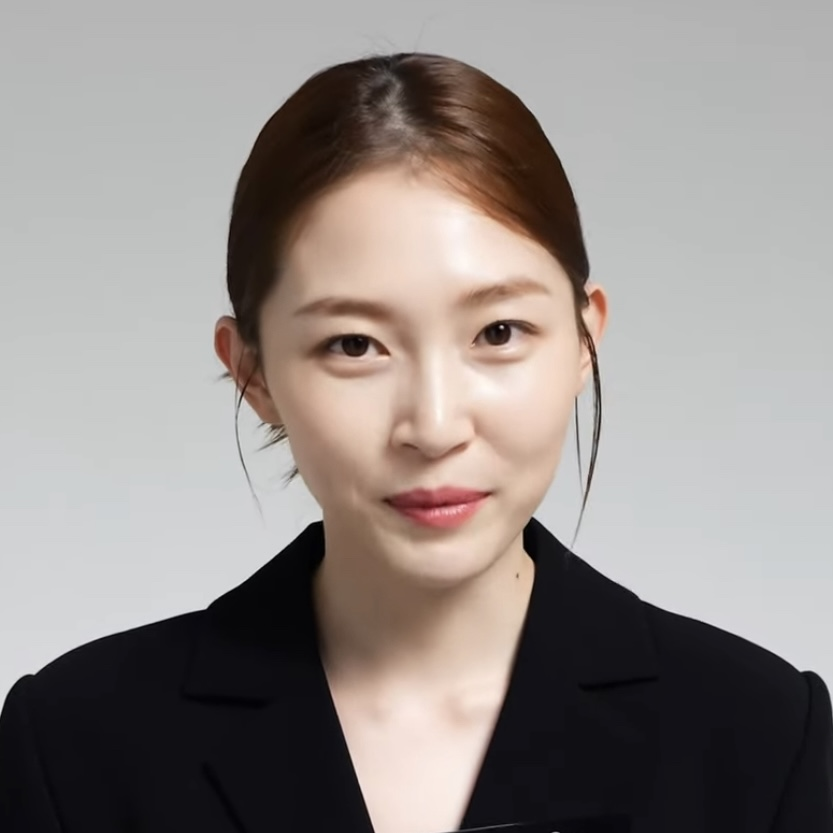
- Park in 2023
- Born: 6 February 1993 (age 33); South Korea
- Education: Department Theater and Film of Far East University
- Occupation: Actress
- Years active: 2017–present
- Agent: BH Entertainment

Korean name
- Hangul: 박유림
- Hanja: 朴有琳
- RR: Bak Yurim
- MR: Pak Yurim
- Website: bhent.co.kr/artist/park-yu-rim

Park Yu-rim (Korean: 박유림, born February 6, 1993) is a South Korean actress and model. She gained international recognition for her debut film role as Yuna in Ryusuke Hamaguchi's film Drive My Car, which won Best International Feature Film Award at the 94th Academy Awards. Park is also known for her role as Choi Min-hee in Lee Chung-hyun's Netflix film Ballerina (2023).

Prior to her breakout roles, Park appeared in supporting roles in television dramas such as Queen of Mystery Season 2 (2018), The Third Charm (2018), and Black Dog: Being A Teacher (2019–2020).

== Early life and education ==
Park Yu-rim's early interest in filmmaking began as a child, when she was captivated by movies. Her curiosity about how films were made led her to develop an aspiration to work in the industry, initially focusing on acting. She subsequently studied theater and film at Far East University. During her studies, she appeared in various plays, including Beautiful Signs, Attic, and Home.

== Career ==
=== 2017–2020: Beginnings ===
In 2017, Park signed an exclusive contract with Next Trend (Santa Music). Prior to this, she had appeared in music videos for Mot's "Cloudy in Seoul" and Moon Scent's "Hands." That same year, she was featured in the music video for Buzz's song "That Love". She was also cast as the lead actress and model for dxyz, a drama produced by 72sec TV as a follow-up to their series DeuxYeoZa. The series aimed to expand the story and enhance the visual experience, with plans to extend the brand into fashion. Park later appeared as a model in cosmetic advertisements.

At the end of 2017, Next Trend announced that Park had been cast as a kindergarten teacher in the tvN Drama Stage production Not Played. The story revolves around a woman in her mid-60s who has spent her life taking care of childcare and household chores, but discovers a hidden talent for billiards when she starts working as a cleaner at a billiards hall. Not Played is one of the ten short drama series in 2018 tvN Drama Stage, (Note: Drama Stage (Korean: 드라마 스테이지; RR: Deurama Seuteiji) is a South Korean weekly television program that features ten one-act dramas, which is similar to KBS2's Drama Special. The short plays were created by writers selected from O'PEN Drama Storyteller Exhibition held by CJ E&M, and these are adapted as one-act dramas produced by the former's subsidiary Studio Dragon in partnership with other companies. It aired on tvN every Saturday at midnight.) written by O'PEN writer Kang Min-soo. (Note: O'PEN is CJ E&M's collaboration with its drama production subsidiaries Studio Dragon and CJ Cultural Foundation to provide an open creative space and opportunity for those who dream of becoming a pen (a writer): television and film scriptwriters. This is a creative development and debut support project that supports the entire process from script planning and development, video production, organization and business matching. CJ E&M boosts investment ₩13 billion (season 1) (approx. US$18 million) to grow drama and movie writers.) The drama was aired on tvN in January 2018.

In 2018, Park took on supporting roles in TV dramas such as Queen of Mystery Season 2 and The Third Charm. This was followed by another supporting role in Black Dog: Being A Teacher (2019–2020), but she had not yet achieved widespread recognition.

=== 2021–present: Career breakthrough ===
Park's background in theater studies at Far East University proved advantageous during her audition for Drive My Car, She was already familiar with the play Uncle Vanya, which is central to the film. During her time at the university, the graduation stage featured rotating performances of Chekhov's four major plays, including Uncle Vanya. Although she did not participate in these specific productions, she had viewed them multiple times.

Park made her film debut in film Drive My Car after being cast through a rigorous audition process. Director Ryusuke Hamaguchi noted, "The Gafuku couple and the Yuna couple have a mirrored relationship that reflects one another." Regarding the casting, he further explained, "During the audition, Park Yu-rim shared an anecdote about not feeling lonely or bored when she had seaweed soup alone with her boyfriend on her birthday. Her genuine humanity naturally stood out to me, and I instantly thought of her for the role."

[...] I truly believe that Drive My Car was my destiny. After graduating from school, there was a time when I felt really devastated because I kept failing auditions. My confidence hit rock bottom, and my self-esteem plummeted. I lived like a ghost. I even questioned whether I should eat anything, thinking, "Am I allowed to eat this?" In my life, there have been three chances that came my way. I thought that the first opportunity came to me. It felt like a life-or-death situation. At that time, it seemed like that was the only thing in my life. Although I'm still young compared to others, I was so exhausted that I even thought about quitting acting. I'm truly grateful to the director.

Director Ryusuke Hamaguchi based the film on various short stories from Haruki Murakami's 2014 collection Men Without Women. In the film, Park portrays Yuna, a newly created character not found in Haruki Murakami's original short stories. Yuna is a mute Korean woman who uses Korean sign language to communicate. She is married to Yoon-su (Jin Dae-yeon) and auditions for the role of Sonya in a production of Uncle Vanya. Yuna's character arc, marked by resilience through personal hardships, mirrors that of Sonya. Park learned and practiced Korean sign language for the role. Park then received her first invitations to major film festivals and awards ceremonies. She was invited to the 26th Busan International Film Festival, followed by the 2021 Cannes Film Festival and the 79th Golden Globe Awards. She was also invited to the 94th Academy Award. Drive My Car went on to win Best International Feature Film Award at the 94th Academy Awards. Her performance in the film managed to earn her domestic and international recognition in the first half of 2022.

"Park Yu-rim's appeal, such as the delicate expression of her eyes, makes you focus."

— Bong Joon-ho at the 26th Busan International Film Festival

In March 2022, Park signed an exclusive contract with BH Entertainment. On April 26, 2022, Netflix Korea announced the confirmation of the production of Lee Chung-hyun's film Ballerina. Park portrays the character of Min-hee, a ballerina whose death leads Ok-ju (Jeon Jong-seo) to seek revenge. Additionally, Park made a memorable appearance in a cameo role as Kang Ji-hye, a wedding hall employee, in the second episode titled "Falling Wedding Dress" of ENA Channel's Extraordinary Attorney Woo.

In 2023, Park took on her first leading role in television in the JTBC drama Miraculous Brothers. The drama revolves around the story of Yook Dong-ju (played by Jung Woo) an aspiring writer facing financial difficulties, who aspires to become the renowned poet Yoon Dong-ju. Alongside him is Kang San (played by Bae Hyun-sung), a boy with mysterious abilities. Together, they embark on a journey to uncover the truth that surpasses the boundaries of time, creating miracles along the way. Park played the role of Park Hyun-soo, a homicide detective with sharp insight. Park received favorable reviews from viewers for her immersive acting skills. With a deep understanding of her character, Park brought a sense of realism to her performance, showcasing quiet charisma and serving as a pivotal figure in the mystery within the drama.

== Filmography ==
=== Film ===
Year	Title		Role	Notes	Ref.
Year	English	Original	Role	Notes	Ref.
2021	Drive My Car	ドライブ・マイ・カー	Lee Yoo-na	Japanese film	
2023	Ballerina	발레리나	Min-hee		
2025	Tristes Tropiques	슬픈 열대	Jojo		

=== Television series ===
Year	Title		Role	Notes	Ref.
Year	English	Original	Role	Notes	Ref.
2018	Drama Stage: "Not Played"	tvN 드라마스테이지 - 낫 플레이드	Yu-rim		
2018	Queen of Mystery 2	추리의 여왕 시즌2	Yu-rim		
2018	The Third Charm	제3의 매력	Nu-ri		
2019	My First First Love	첫사랑은 처음이라서	Choe Min-ah		
2019	Black Dog: Being A Teacher	블랙독	Ryu Jin-hee		
2022	Extraordinary Attorney Woo	이상한 변호사 우영우	Kang Ji-hye	Cameo (episode 2)	
2023	Miraculous Brothers	기적의 형제	Park Hyun-soo		
2026	KBS Drama Special: "Sound:Track"	KBS 드라마 스페셜: 사운드:트랙	Park So-jung		

=== Web series ===
Year	Title		Role	Notes	Ref.
Year	English	Original	Role	Notes	Ref.
2017	DXYZ: "Two Women and a Zombie"	dxyz EP2. 두여자와 좀비	Mo-ri	YouTube Web Series	

=== Music video appearances ===
Year	Song's Title		Artist	Ref.
Year	English	Original	Artist	Ref.
2012	"Cloudy in Seoul"	서울은 흐림	Mot	
2017	"Hourly Hand"	시곗 바늘	Moon Scent	
2017	"The Love"	사랑하지 않은 것처럼	Buzz	

== Awards and nominations ==
Awards and nominations received by Park
Award ceremony	Year	Category	Nominee / Work	Result	Ref.
Marie Claire Asia Star Awards	2023	Rising Star Award	Drive My Car and Ballerina	Won	
