= Far East =

Geographical term for eastern Asia

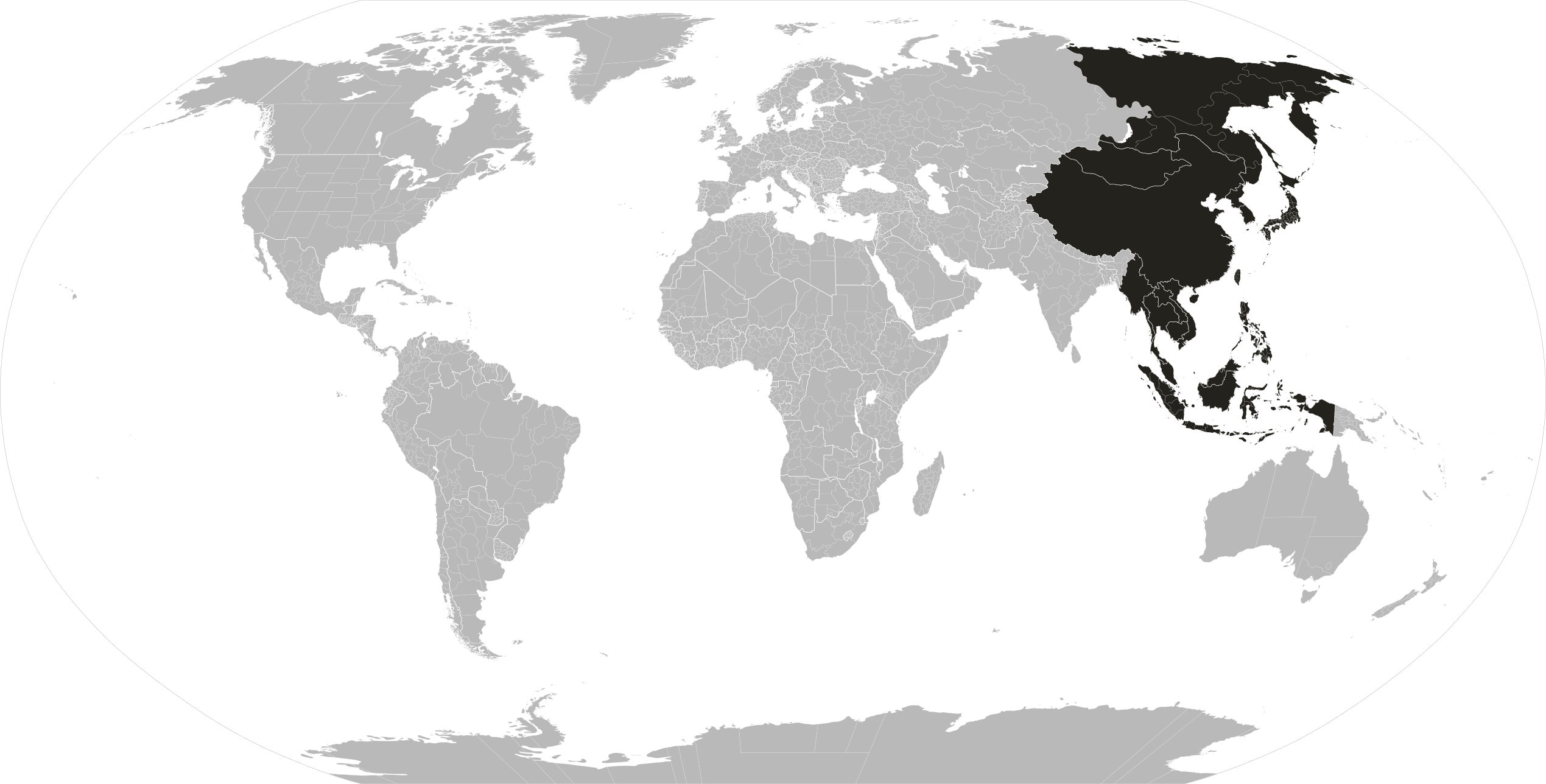
- Location of the Far East, geographically defined

Chinese name
- Traditional Chinese: 遠東
- Simplified Chinese: 远东
- Literal meaning: Far East
Transcriptions
Standard Mandarin
- Hanyu Pinyin: Yuǎn Dōng
- Bopomofo: ㄩㄢˇ ㄉㄨㄥ
- Wade–Giles: Yüan^{3} Tung^{1}
- Tongyong Pinyin: Yuǎn Dong
- IPA: [ɥɛ̀n tʊ́ŋ]
Yue: Cantonese
- Yale Romanization: Yúhn Dūng
- Jyutping: Jyun5 Dung1
- IPA: [jyn˩˧ tʊŋ˥]
Southern Min
- Hokkien POJ: Óan-tong
- Tâi-lô: Uán-tong

Burmese name
- Burmese: အရှေ့ဖျား ဒေသ
- IPA: [ʔəʃḛbjá dèθa̰]

Vietnamese name
- Vietnamese alphabet: Viễn Đông
- Chữ Hán: 遠東

Thai name
- Thai: ตะวันออกไกล
- RTGS: Tawan-ok Klai

Korean name
- Hangul: 극동
- Hanja: 極東
Transcriptions
- Revised Romanization: Geuk Dong
- McCune–Reischauer: Kŭk Tong

Mongolian name
- Mongolian Cyrillic: Алс Дорнод; Als Dornod

Japanese name
- Kanji: 極東
- Hiragana: きょくとう
- Katakana: キョクトウ
Transcriptions
- Revised Hepburn: Kyokutō
- Kunrei-shiki: Kyokutô

Malay name
- Malay: تيمور جا^{ء}وه; Timur Jauh

Indonesian name
- Indonesian: Timur Jauh

Filipino name
- Tagalog: ᜃᜐᜒᜎᜅᜈᜈ᜔ Kasilanganan ᜐᜒᜎᜅᜈᜈ᜔ Silanganan (poetic) ᜋᜎᜌᜓᜅ᜔ ᜐᜒᜎᜅᜈ᜔ Malayong Silangan (literal)

Uyghur name
- Uyghur: شەرقىي ئاسىيا; Şerqiy Asiya; Шәрқий Асия

Tamil name
- Tamil: தூர கிழக்கு Tūra Kiḻakku

Portuguese name
- Portuguese: Extremo Oriente

Russian name
- Russian: Дальний Восток; IPA: [ˈdalʲnʲɪj vɐˈstok]
- Romanization: Dál'niy Vostók

Lao name
- Lao: ຕາເວັນອອກໄກ; Taven-ok kai

Khmer name
- Khmer: ចុងបូព៌ា Chong Bopea

Tetun name
- Tetun: Dok Lorosa'e

The Far East is the geographical region that encompasses the easternmost portion of the Asian continent, including East Asia, Southeast Asia, and the Russian Far East. South Asia is sometimes also included in the definition of the term. In modern times, the term Far East has widely fallen out of use and been replaced by Asia-Pacific, while the terms Middle East and Near East, although now pertaining to different territories, are still commonly used today.

The term first came into use in European geopolitical discourse in the 15th century, particularly the British, denoting the Far East as the "farthest" of the three "Easts", beyond the Near East and the Middle East. Likewise, during the Qing dynasty of the 19th and early 20th centuries, the term "Tàixī (泰西)" – i.e., anything further west than the Arab world – was used to refer to the Western countries.

Since the mid-20th century, the term has mostly gone out of use for the region in international mass media outlets due to its perceived Eurocentric connotations. North Asia is sometimes excluded due to cultural and ethnic differences.

The term is still used in Russia to refer to its sparsely populated easternmost regions (being "far" in this case from the political, economic and cultural centres, Moscow and Saint Petersburg).

== Popularization ==
Among Western Europeans, prior to the colonial era, Far East referred to anything further east than the Middle East. In the 16th century, King John III of Portugal called India a "rich and interesting country in the Far East (Extremo Oriente)." The term was popularized during the period of the British Empire as a blanket term for lands to the east of the British Indian Empire.

In pre-World War I European geopolitics, Near East referred to the relatively nearby lands of the Ottoman Empire, Middle East denoted north-western Southern Asian region and Central Asia, and the Far East meant countries along the western Pacific Ocean and eastern Indian Ocean. Many European languages have analogous terms, such as the French (Extrême-Orient), Spanish (Extremo Oriente), Portuguese (Extremo Oriente), Italian (Estremo Oriente), German (Ferner Osten), Polish (Daleki Wschód), Norwegian (Det fjerne Østen) and Dutch (Verre Oosten).

== Cultural and geographic meaning ==
Significantly, the term evokes cultural as well as geographic separation; the Far East is not just geographically distant, but also culturally exotic. It never refers, for instance, to the culturally Western nations of Australia and New Zealand, which lie even farther to the east of Europe than East Asia itself. This combination of cultural and geographic subjectivity was well illustrated in 1939 by Robert Menzies, a prime minister of Australia. Reflecting on his country's geopolitical situation with the onset of war, Menzies commented that: "The problems of the Pacific are different. What Great Britain calls the Far East is to us the near north."

Far East, in its usual sense, is comparable to terms such as the Orient (Latin for "East"), Eastern world, or simply the East, all of which may refer, broadly, to East and South-East Asia in general. Occasionally, albeit more in the past, the Russian Far East and South Asia have been deemed to be part of the Far East.

Commenting on such terms, John K. Fairbank and Edwin O. Reischauer (both professors of East Asian Studies at Harvard University) wrote, in East Asia: The Great Tradition:

When Europeans traveled far to the east to reach Cathay, Japan and the Indies, they naturally gave those distant regions the general name 'Far East.' Americans who reached China, Japan and Southeast Asia by sail and steam across the Pacific could, with equal logic, have called that area the 'Far West.' For the people who live in that part of the world, however, it is neither 'East' nor 'West' and certainly not 'Far.' A more generally acceptable term for the area is 'East Asia,' which is geographically more precise and does not imply the outdated notion that Europe is the center of the civilized world.

Today, the term remains in the names of some longstanding institutions, including the Far Eastern Federal University in Vladivostok, Far Eastern University in Manila, the Far East University in South Korea, and Far East, the periodical magazine of the Missionary Society of St. Columban. Furthermore, the United States and United Kingdom have historically incorporated Far East in the names of several military units and commands in the region, such as the British Royal Navy's Far East Fleet, for instance.

== Territories and regions conventionally included in the Far East ==
Name of region and territory, with flag	Area (km^{2})	Population	Population density (per km^{2})	Capital	Forms of government	Currency	Official languages
North Asia
Russia	13,100,000	37,600,000	2.6	Moscow	Federal semi-presidential republic	Ruble	Russian and 27 other co-official languages
East Asia
China	9,598,094	1,371,821,094	145.0	Beijing	One-party socialist republic	Yuan (Renminbi)	Chinese (Mandarin)
Hong Kong	1,108	7,448,900	6,777.0	Hong Kong	Special administrative region	Hong Kong dollar	Chinese, English
Japan	377,973	126,440,000	334.0	Tokyo	Parliamentary democracy, Constitutional monarchy	Yen	None
Macau	115.3	653,100	21,340.0	Macau	Special administrative region	Pataca	Chinese, Portuguese
Mongolia	1,566,000	3,081,677	1.97	Ulaanbaatar	Semi-presidential system	Tögrög	Mongolian
North Korea	120,540	25,368,620	212.0	Pyongyang	Juche unitarian dictatorship Socialist Republic	North Korean won	Korean
South Korea	100,363	51,446,201	507.0	Seoul	Unitary presidential republic	South Korean won	Korean
Taiwan	36,197	23,577,271	650.0	Taipei	Semi-presidential system	New Taiwan dollar	Chinese (Mandarin)
Southeast Asia
Brunei	5,765	417,200	72.11	Bandar Seri Begawan	Absolute Islamic Sultanate	Brunei dollar	Malay and English
Cambodia	181,035	16,245,729	81.8	Phnom Penh	Constitutional monarchy	Riel	Khmer
Christmas Island	135	1,692	12.5	Flying Fish Cove	External territory of Australia	Australian dollar	None
Cocos (Keeling) Islands	14	593	42.4	West Island	External territory of Australia	Australian dollar	None
Indonesia	1,904,569	261,115,456	138.0	Jakarta	Presidential republic	Rupiah	Indonesian
Laos	237,955	6,758,353	26.7	Vientiane	Socialist Republic	Kip	Lao
Malaysia	330,803	32,049,700	92.0	Kuala Lumpur	Federal constitutional monarchy, Parliamentary democracy	Ringgit	Malay
Myanmar (Burma)	676,578	53,582,855	76.0	Naypyidaw	Unitary presidential constitutional republic	Kyat	Burmese
Philippines	300,000	100,981,437	336.0	Manila	Unitary presidential constitutional republic	Philippine peso (Piso)	Filipino and English
Singapore	722.5	5,638,700	7,804.0	Singapore	Parliamentary republic	Singapore dollar	Malay, English, Chinese (Mandarin), and Tamil
Thailand	513,120	68,863,514	132.1	Bangkok	Constitutional monarchy, Parliamentary democracy	Baht	Thai
Timor-Leste (East Timor)	15,410	1,167,242	78.0	Dili	Parliamentary republic	U.S. dollar / Centavo coins	Tetum and Portuguese
Vietnam	331,212	94,569,072	276.03	Hanoi	One-party, Socialist Republic	đồng	Vietnamese

== Demographics ==
=== Cities ===
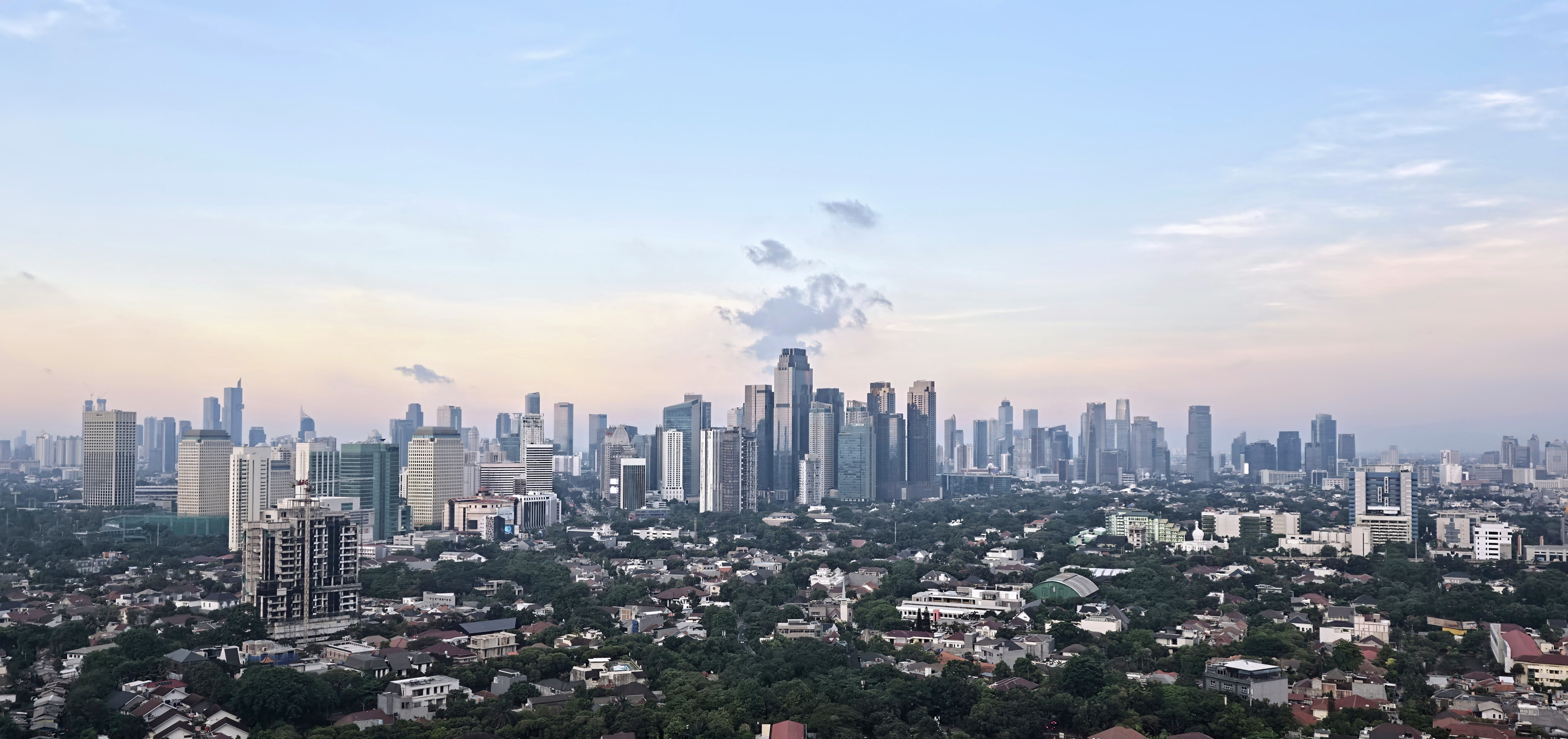
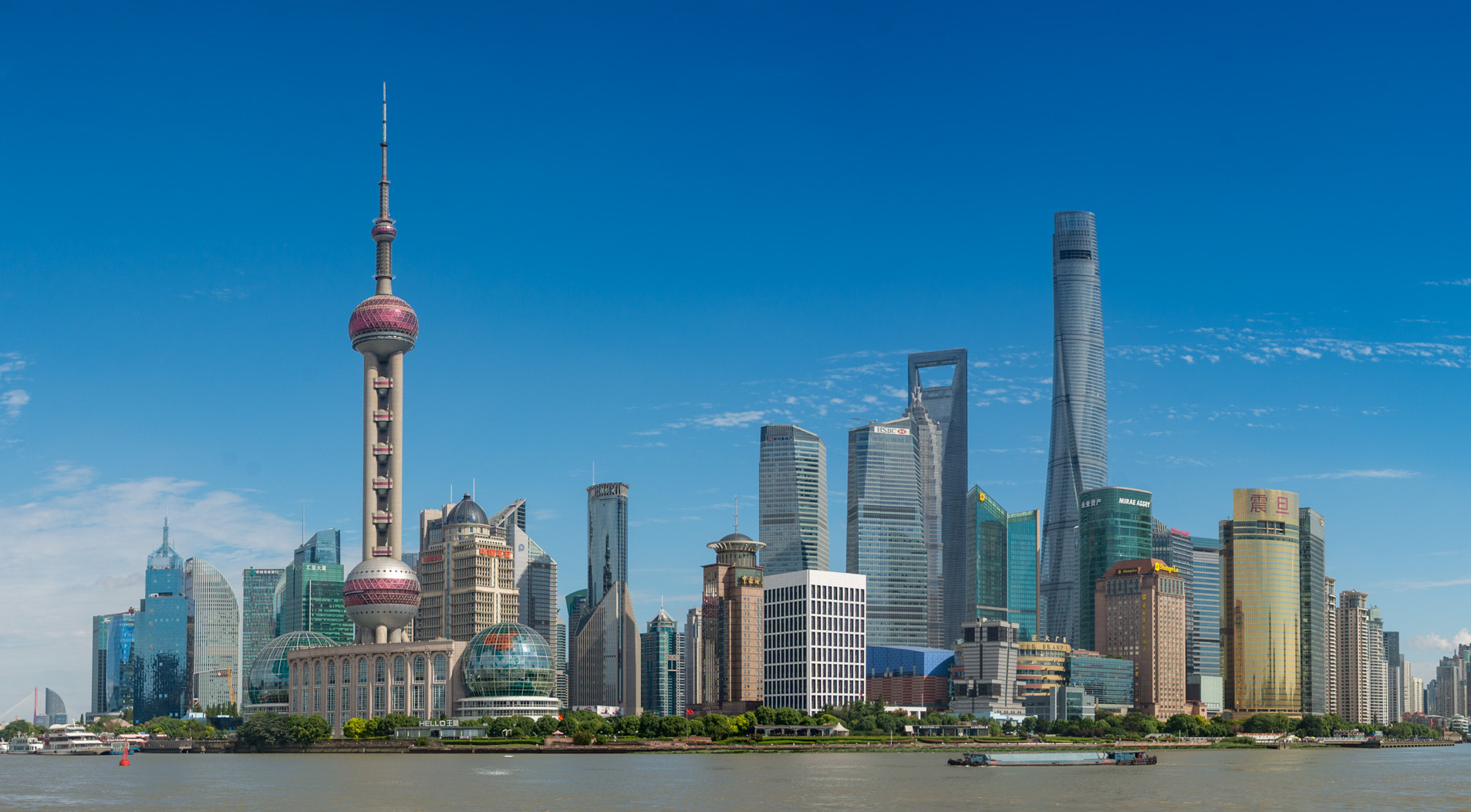
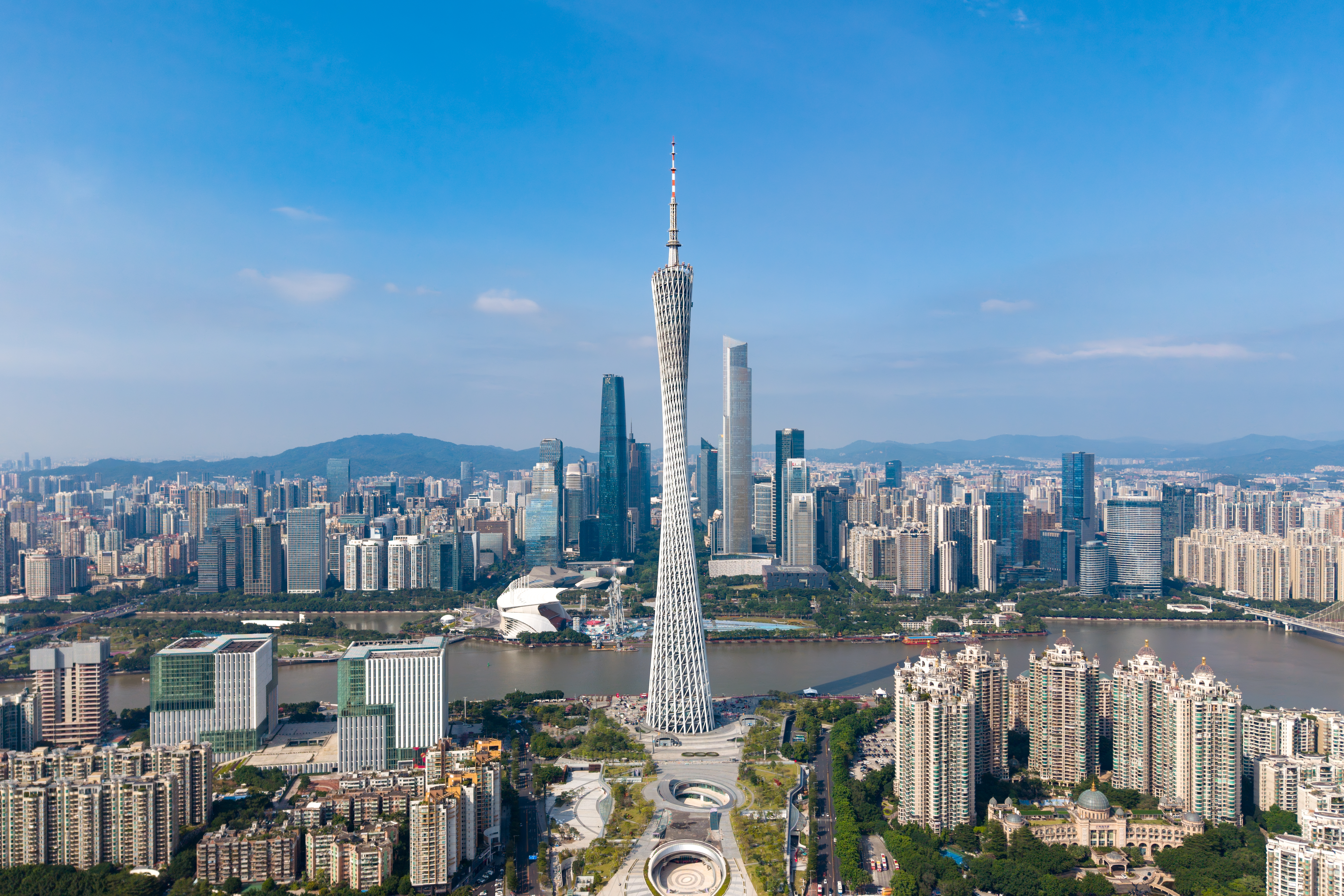
Largest population centres of the Far East
	Rank	City name	Country	Pop.
Jakarta Tokyo	1	Jakarta	Indonesia	41,913,860	Shanghai Guangzhou
Jakarta Tokyo	2	Tokyo	Japan	33,412,512	Shanghai Guangzhou
Jakarta Tokyo	3	Shanghai	China	29,558,908	Shanghai Guangzhou
Jakarta Tokyo	4	Guangzhou	China	27,563,372	Shanghai Guangzhou
Jakarta Tokyo	5	Manila	Philippines	24,735,305	Shanghai Guangzhou
Jakarta Tokyo	6	Seoul	South Korea	22,490,482	Shanghai Guangzhou
Jakarta Tokyo	7	Bangkok	Thailand	18,180,280	Shanghai Guangzhou
Jakarta Tokyo	8	Beijing	China	17,013,303	Shanghai Guangzhou
Jakarta Tokyo	9	Ho Chi Minh City	Vietnam	14,052,713	Shanghai Guangzhou
Jakarta Tokyo	10	Shenzhen	China	13,878,396	Shanghai Guangzhou

=== Religion ===
Religion in the Far East (2020)
1. No religion (38.4%)
2. Buddhism (22.0%)
3. Folk religion (15.2%)
4. Islam (12.8%)
5. Christianity (10.2%)
6. Other (1.40%)

== See also ==
- Asia–Pacific
  - Pacific Asia
- East Asia
- East Asian cultural sphere
- East–West dichotomy
- Far West, a term for Europe
- Four Asian Tigers – Hong Kong, Singapore, South Korea and Taiwan
- Greater East Asia Co-Prosperity Sphere, Japanese idea from the 1930s–1940s
- Inner Asia
- List of Mongol states
- North Asia
  - Russian Far East
  - Siberia
  - Ural (region)
- Northeast Asia
- Orient
- South Asia
- Southeast Asia
- Tropical Asia
- Turkic migration

Organizations

- ASEAN+3
- Comprehensive Economic Partnership for East Asia
- East Asian Community
- Regional Comprehensive Economic Partnership
- Southeast Asian Fisheries Development Center
