= Hye-in =

- Hangul: 혜인
- RR: Hyein
- MR: Hyein
- IPA: [çein]

Hye-in is a Korean given name.

People with this name include:

- Yong Hyein (born 1990), South Korean civil society activist
- Jung Seol-bin (born Jung Hye-in, 1990), South Korean football forward
- Choi Hye-in (born 1992), South Korean badminton player
- Heyne (singer) (born Kim Hye-in, 1992), South Korean singer
- Kim Hye-in (born 1993), South Korean actress
- Lee Hye-in (actress) (born 1995), South Korean actress
- Lee Hye-in (fencer) (born 1995), South Korean fencer
- Hyein (born Lee Hye-in, 2008), South Korean singer, member of girl group NewJeans

Fictional characters with this name include:

- Yoon Hye-in, in 2010 South Korean television series Athena: Goddess of War
- Lee Hye-in and Ri Hye-in, in 2013 South Korean film Commitment

== See also ==
- List of Korean given names
