= Bargain (TV series) =

2022 South Korean television series

- Also known as: Ransom
- Hangul: 몸값
- RR: Momgap
- MR: Momkap
- Genre: Drama; Thriller
- Based on: Bargain by Lee Chung-hyun
- Written by: Choi Byeong-yun; Jeon Woo-sung
- Screenplay by: Kwak Jae-min
- Directed by: Jeon Woo-sung
- Starring: Jin Seon-kyu; Jeon Jong-seo; Chang Ryul
- Composer: Lee Ji-soo
- Country of origin: South Korea
- Original language: Korean
- No. of episodes: 6

Production
- Producer: Kim Bo-ra
- Cinematography: Kim Young-ho
- Editor: Han Mi-yeon
- Running time: 33-37 minutes
- Production companies: CJ ENM; Climax Studio; SLL

Original release
- Network: TVING; Paramount+
- Release: October 28 – November 4, 2022

Bargain (Korean: 몸값) is a 2022 South Korean television miniseries directed by Jeon Woo-sung and starring Jin Seon-kyu, Jeon Jong-seo and Chang Ryul. It aired on TVING from October 28 through November 4, 2022.

== Cast ==
- Jin Seon-kyu as Noh Hyung-soo
- Jeon Jong-seo as Park Joo-young
- Chang Ryul as Go Geuk-ryul
- Shin Jae-hwi as Chang-soon
- Park Hyung-soo as Hee-sook
- Oh Min-ae as Lee Chun-nam

== Production ==
The series was adapted from the 2015 short film Bargain, directed by Lee Chung-hyun. The principal photography of the series commenced in 2022, with Jin Seon-kyu and Jeon Jong-seo joining the cast.

The series was co-produced by CJ ENM and Paramount Global, with the latter handled the global distribution outside South Korea, Japan and Taiwan.

== Release ==
The series premiered at the 27th Busan International Film Festival and screened at the 2023 Toronto International Film Festival.

== Reception ==
=== Critical reception ===
In her review for TheGuardian.com, Lucy Mangan gave the series a four-star rating out of five.

The series was reviewed by various other media publications, such as Decider, Entertainment Weekly, The Hollywood Reporter and Observer.

== Accolades ==
Name of the award ceremony, year presented, category, nominee(s) of the award, and the result of the nomination
Award ceremony	Year	Category	Nominee / Work	Result	Ref.
Cannes International Series Festival	2023	Best Screenplay	Choi Byeong-yun, Jeon Woo-sung and Kwak Jae-min	Won	
Critics' Choice Awards	2024	Best Foreign Language Series	Bargain	Nominated	
Seriencamp	2023	Critics Choice	—N/a	Won	
