= Taixi =

Chinese Taixi can refer to:

- Far West (Taixi), 泰西 the Western world
- Taixi (embryonic breathing), 胎息 Daoist meditation and Internal Alchemy methods
- Taisi, Yunlin, or Taixi 臺西 a township in Taiwan
