= The Third Charm =

2018 South Korean TV series

- Promotional poster
- Also known as: The 3rd Charm
- Hangul: 제3의 매력
- RR: Je3ui maeryeok
- MR: Che3ŭi maeryŏk
- Genre: Romantic comedy
- Written by: Park Eun-young; Park Hee-kwon
- Directed by: Pyo Min-soo
- Starring: Seo Kang-joon; Esom
- Country of origin: South Korea
- Original language: Korean
- No. of episodes: 16

Production
- Production locations: South Korea; Portugal
- Camera setup: Single-camera
- Running time: 60 minutes
- Production companies: Imagine Asia; JYP Pictures

Original release
- Network: JTBC
- Release: September 28 – November 17, 2018

The Third Charm (Korean: 제3의 매력) is a 2018 South Korean drama directed by Pyo Min-soo and starring Seo Kang-joon and Esom. It explores the real side of relationships between couples. The series aired on JTBC from September 28 to November 17, 2018, every Friday and Saturday at 23:00 (KST).

== Synopsis ==
The drama follows the realistic romance of a couple with completely opposite personalities who unexpectedly met on a group blind date.

On Joon-young (Seo Kang-joon) is a sensitive 20-year-old university student who does not care about fashion and plans more than necessary. He takes part in his first blind date, where he meets Young-jae; they begin to date.

Lee Young-jae (Esom) is a cold, yet spontaneous and honest 20-year-old girl. She does not have parents, but she is really close to her older brother. They live together and rely on each other. Her dream is to become rich and she decided to work as a hairdresser's assistant rather than going to a university. A friend then dragged her to a blind meeting with a university student. There, she meets Joon-young who has a totally different personality from her.

== Cast ==
=== Main ===
- Seo Kang-joon as On Joon-young, a sensitive university student who never deviates from his perfectly-scheduled routines.
- Esom as Lee Young-jae, a cold, yet spontaneous and honest woman who gave up college and started working as an assistant hairdresser.

=== Supporting ===
- Yang Dong-geun as Lee Soo-jae, Young-jae's brother. A barista who runs a coffee truck and dreams of becoming a screenwriter.
- Lee Yoon-ji as Baek Joo-ran, boss of the hair salon where Young-jae works.
- Min Woo-hyuk as Choi Ho-chul, a talented plastic surgeon who has a crush on Young-jae.
- Kim Yoon-hye as Min Se-eun, a police officer who likes Joon-young.
- Lee Sang-yi as Hyun Sang-hyun, Joon-young's best friend.
- Park Gyu-young as On Ri-won, Joon-young's younger sister.
- Shin Do-hyun as Kim So-hee, a top star loved by many due to her beautiful appearance. She is Young-jae's high school alumnus and rival.
- Oh Young-sil as Joon-young's mother
- Yang Dae-hyuk as Joo Kwang-ho
- Park Ji-il as Joon-young's father
- Bang Jae-ho as Jae-woo
- Lee Si-hoo as Baek Joo-ran's blind date
- Lee Chung-mi as Mi-young
- Han Byul as Dong-goo, Joon-young's close friend.
- Choi Byung-mo as Designer Hong
- Park Yu-rim as Nu-ri, a new staff member at the hair salon where Young-jae works.

== Production ==
- The female lead role was first offered to Chun Woo-hee and Choi Soo-young in April and May 2018 respectively, but both actresses declined the offer.
- The first script reading was held in July 2018 at JTBC building in Sangam-dong, Seoul.
- Overseas filming took place in several cities in Portugal.

== Original soundtrack ==
The Third Charm OST

Soundtrack album by Various artists
- Released: 2018
- Genre: Soundtrack
- Languages: Korean; English
- Labels: NHN Bugs, OU Entertainment

=== Part 1 ===
Released on September 28, 2018
No.	Title	Lyrics	Music	Artist	Length
1.	"Only You" (그대만 보여)	Ra.L	Kaemi; Ra.L	Stella Jang	03:10
2.	"Only You" (Inst.)		Kaemi; Ra.L		03:10
Total length:					06:20

=== Part 2 ===
Released on October 5, 2018
No.	Title	Lyrics	Music	Artist	Length
1.	"Perhaps We" (어쩌면 우린)	Tae Yoon-mi; Jo Sung-mo	Kaemi	Jo Sung-mo	04:00
2.	"You Have The Charms" (매력있어)	Ra.L; Naomi	Ra.L	CJM	03:05
3.	"Perhaps We" (Inst.)		Kaemi		04:00
4.	"You Have The Charms" (Inst.)		Ra.L		03:05
Total length:					14:10

=== Part 3 ===
Released on October 12, 2018
No.	Title	Lyrics	Music	Artist	Length
1.	"Think About You"	Hwang Seok-joo; Seo Jae-ha; Kim Young-sung	Seo Jae-ha; Kim Young-sung	Yongzoo	03:40
2.	"Liked It" (좋았는데)	Ra.L; Naomi	Ra.L	Boramiyu	04:05
3.	"Think About You" (Inst.)		Seo Jae-ha; Kim Young-sung		03:40
4.	"Liked It" (Inst.)		Ra.L		04:05
Total length:					15:30

=== Part 4 ===
Released on October 19, 2018
No.	Title	Lyrics	Music	Artist	Length
1.	"Maybe Not" (안되나봐)	Yang Dong-geun; Manuka	Stoner Tunes	Yang Dong-geun; Manuka	03:06
2.	"Maybe Not" (Inst.)		Stoner Tunes		03:06
Total length:					06:12

=== Part 5 ===
Released on October 26, 2018
No.	Title	Lyrics	Music	Artist	Length
1.	"Hee Jae" (희재)	Yang Jae-seon	MGR	Lim Han-byul	04:01
2.	"Hee Jae" (Inst.)		MGR		04:01
Total length:					08:02

=== Part 6 ===
Released on November 3, 2018
No.	Title	Lyrics	Music	Artist	Length
1.	"When It Rains" (비가 오면)	Kim Eun-jae	Kim Eun-jae	Soyou, Mad Clown	03:35
2.	"When It Rains" (Inst.)		Kim Eun-jae		03:35
Total length:					07:10

=== Part 7 ===
Released on November 9, 2018
No.	Title	Lyrics	Music	Artist	Length
1.	"With The Season" (계절을 담아)	Gaemi	Gaemi	Kim Yeon-ji	04:31
2.	"With The Season" (Inst.)		Gaemi		04:31
Total length:					09:02

== Viewership ==
The Third Charm : South Korea viewers per episode (thousands)

Season	Episode number															
Season	1	2	3	4	5	6	7	8	9	10	11	12	13	14	15	16
1	TBD	424	695	831	623	706	727	729	437	681	583	565	466	630	446	697

Source: Audience measurement performed nationwide by Nielsen Media Research.

Average TV viewership ratings
Ep.	Original broadcast date	Average audience share (Nielsen Korea)	
Ep.	Original broadcast date	Nationwide	Seoul
1	September 28, 2018	1.804%	2.240%
2	September 29, 2018	1.795%	1.850%
3	October 5, 2018	2.859%	3.057%
4	October 6, 2018	3.374%	3.237%
5	October 12, 2018	2.722%	3.007%
6	October 13, 2018	2.970%	3.026%
7	October 19, 2018	3.050%	3.614%
8	October 20, 2018	3.035%	3.058%
9	October 26, 2018	1.979%	N/A
10	October 27, 2018	2.348%	2.227%
11	November 2, 2018	2.614%	2.910%
12	November 3, 2018	2.614%	2.700%
13	November 9, 2018	2.220%	2.340%
14	November 10, 2018	2.824%	3.089%
15	November 16, 2018	2.178%	2.349%
16	November 17, 2018	2.934%	3.071%
Average		2.583%	2.785%
In the table above, the blue numbers represent the lowest ratings and the red numbers represent the highest ratings.; N/A denotes that the rating is not known.; This series aired on a cable channel/pay TV which normally has a relatively smaller audience compared to free-to-air TV/public broadcasters (KBS, SBS, MBC and EBS).
