= Eumseong County =

Eumseong
- County
- Panoramic view of Eumseong-eup

- Flag

- Location in South Korea
- Coordinates: 37.000°N 127.583°E
- Country: South Korea
- Region: Hoseo
- Administrative divisions: 2 eup, 7 myeon

Government
  - Mayor: Cho Byeong-ok(조병옥)

Area
  - Total: 520.12 km^{2} (200.82 sq mi)

Population (2025)
  - Total: 92,818
  - Density: 69/km^{2} (180/sq mi)
  - Dialect: Chungcheong

Korean name
- Hangul: 음성군
- Hanja: 陰城郡
- RR: Eumseong-gun
- MR: Ŭmsŏng-gun

Eumseong County (Korean: 음성군) is a county in North Chungcheong Province, South Korea, best known for being the birthplace of former UN Secretary-General Ban Ki-moon.

Eumseong Clean Peppers Festival is held in Eumseong-gun, Chungbuk every September. It has been held since 1982. It is held along with the Seolseong Cultural Festival. Events such as chili pepper fairy, Mr. chili pepper contest, fireworks, and county people's singing contest will be held together with events such as masquerade, torch relay, demonstration event, folk game, and athletic competition. Since 2009, the Eumseong Clean Pepper Lady Contest has been held instead of the Red Pepper Fairy Contest.

== History ==
Eumseong County is composed of two towns (eup) and seven townships (myeon), with a total population of 98,619 people (including foreigners) as of March 31, 2013. The most central town is Geumwang (which also goes by the name Muguk). Although Jincheon-gun and Chungbuk Innovation City are jointly attracted to each other, they have the advantage that infrastructure is concentrated in areas that are promoted to the city first, so they are forming a rivalry with the leadership of Chungbuk Innovation City.

Town/township	Hangul	Hanja	Area (km^{2})	Households	Population
Eumseong-eup	음성읍	陰城邑	86	7,814	19,002
Geumwang-eup	금왕읍	金旺邑	71	8,839	22,602
Soi-myeon	소이면	蘇伊面	49	1,545	3,302
Weonnam-myeon	원남면	遠南面	65	1,548	3,286
Maengdong-myeon	맹동면	孟洞面	35	1,676	5,604
Daeso-myeon	대소면	大所面	38	7,192	18,731
Samseong-myeon	삼성면	三成面	51	3,902	9,410
Saenggeuk-myeon	생극면	笙極面	56	2,228	5,252
Gamgok-myeon	감곡면	甘谷面	69	5,002	11,430
Total			520	39,746	98,619

Eumseong-gun is a traditional agricultural area based on fertile soil and abundant water resources. It is located in the center of the country, classified as the Han River and Geum River basin, and borders Icheon-si, Gyeonggi-do to the north, Anseong-si, Gyeonggi-do to the northwest, Chungju-si, Chungcheongbuk-do to the east, Goesan-gun, Chungcheongbuk-do to the south, and Jincheon-gun, Chungcheongbuk-do to the west. In particular, the northwest has many mountains and hills and abundant water sources, so it has been a fertile land with good farming since ancient times, and has been famous for its famous for its kind people. There are no famous mountains nationwide, but as part of the Sobaek Mountains, mountains with relatively well-preserved natural ecosystems such as Gaseop-san (710 m), Buyong-san (644 m), Suri-san (505 m), and Sureui-san (679 m) are loved by mountaineers from other regions.

Many farmers live in Eumseong County. They host two cultural festivals: the Pumba (traditional vagabond) Festival (품바축제) in the spring and the Gochu (chili pepper) Festival (고추축제) in the fall. Eumseong is famous in Korea for its production of high-quality red chili peppers. Eumseong is also renowned for its strawberries, ginseng, watermelon, and beef.

Eumseong County is home to three different high schools. Eumseong High School is located in the city of Eumseong, Chungbuk Semi-Conductor High School is located in Geumwang, and Maegoe High School is located in Gamgok. Maegoe is a Catholic all girls middle school as well as a mixed gender high school located at the base of a steep sided hill under a Christ-shaped statue. In addition, Global Vision Christian School|GVCS, an English-speaking Christian boarding school, is located in the city of Eumseong.

There are two institutes of higher education in Eumseong county that are both located in the township Gamgok - Far East University and Gangdong College. Far East University is a four-year school while Gangdong College has only a two-year program. As of 2013, 20 to 30 foreign English teachers live in Eumseong County, who are from countries including the United States of America, Canada, South Africa, England, and Scotland.

The name "Eumseong" means "shaded castle" and is not to be confused with its homonym "human voice".

In 1956, Eumseong's status was promoted from township to town. In 1973, Geumwang's status was also promoted to that of a town.

Historically, the area of 'Eumseong' was limited to the current Eumseong-eup and Wonnam-myeon areas, and all other towns and villages were the areas of Chungju.

== Population ==
- Eumseong-gun CI Eumseong-gun, Chungcheongbuk-do Population Trend

(1966~present)

- 125,108 in 1966
- 1970 112,716
- 111,142 in 1975
- 1980 96,311 people
- 1985 83,379 people
- 74,674 in 1990
- 1995 83,682 people
- 87,956 in 2000
- 85,969 people in 2005
- 91,093 people in 2010
- 96,396 people in 2015
- 93,153 in 2020
- August 2022 92,277 people

Population is based on the administrative district for the year, not the current administrative district, the maximum value in the graph is 200,000 people 1966-1990: National Statistical Office Census, 1995–Present: Resident Registration Population Statistics of Ministry of Public Administration and Security

== Samseong ==
Samseong is located in the northwest of Eumseong County, just east of the Jungbu Expressway. The township's bus terminal has connections to Dong Seoul station that take about 1.5 hours as well as connections to other provincial cities and towns.

Samseong has a middle school, an elementary school and several private academies or hagwons. The township is arranged principally around one street, which comprises a covered market, CU, 7 Eleven, Paris Baguette, and many Korean restaurants and hofs.

There are rice paddies between the various factories. In addition there are two sizeable lakes and a mountain named Mai San which is excellent for hiking.

Known for spotting wildlife, Samseong was formerly a prime location for encountering species now thought to be endangered.

== Sister cities ==
- Gangdong-gu, Seoul
- Taizhou, Jiangsu, China

== People born here ==
- Lee Chan-dong
- Ban Ki-moon.
