= Miraculous Brothers =

2023 South Korean television series

- Promotional poster
- Hangul: 기적의 형제
- Hanja: 奇跡의 兄弟
- Lit.: Miracle Brothers
- RR: Gijeogui hyeongje
- MR: Kijŏgŭi hyŏngje
- Genre: Mystery; Fantasy
- Written by: Kim Ji-woo
- Directed by: Park Chan-hong
- Starring: Jung Woo; Bae Hyun-sung; Park Yu-rim; Oh Man-seok; Lee Ki-woo
- Music by: Lim Ha-young
- Country of origin: South Korea
- Original language: Korean
- No. of episodes: 16

Production
- Executive producer: Park Seul-gi (CP)
- Producers: Lee Jung-hee; Kim Geon-hong; Hwang Ra-kyung; Jeon Seo-won; Kim Yu-ri; Kim Su-ji; Jo Dong-min
- Editors: Kim Young-joo; Kwon Seon-an
- Production companies: MI; SLL; Fantagio

Original release
- Network: JTBC
- Release: June 28 – August 17, 2023

Miraculous Brothers (Korean: 기적의 형제) is a 2023 South Korean television series starring Jung Woo, Bae Hyun-sung, Park Yu-rim, Oh Man-seok, and Lee Ki-woo. It aired on JTBC from June 28 to August 17, 2023, every Wednesday and Thursday at 22:30 (KST). It is also available for streaming on Viki and Viu in selected regions.

== Synopsis ==
The series is about Yuk Dong-joo (Jung Woo), a passionate middle-aged man who has nothing but debt, and Kang-san (Bae Hyun-sung), an unidentified boy with mysterious abilities. It depicts the process of creating a miracle by finding the truth beyond the boundaries of time.

== Cast and characters ==
=== Main ===
- Jung Woo as Yuk Dong-joo: an aspiring writer who makes a living by working part-time jobs while writing novels.
- Bae Hyun-sung as Lee Kang-san: an unidentified boy who has lost his memory due to an accident, and develops a mysterious ability to feel the pain and despair of others and read their minds.
- Park Yu-rim as Park Hyun-soo: a homicide detective.
- Oh Man-seok as Kai: a mysterious man.
- Lee Ki-woo as Lee Myung-seok: the representative of a publishing company.

=== Supporting ===
==== People around Dong-joo and Kang-san ====
- Kang Mal-geum as Chae Woo-jung: CEO of a book café.
  - Park Ji-hu as young Chae Woo-jung
- Seo Jae-hee as Kang Hye-kyung: CEO of a high-class social café.
- So Hee-jung as Cha Young-sook: Dong-joo's mother.
- Jo Bok-rae as Jung Yong-dae: Dong-joo's best friend who is a police officer.
- Lee Ji-hyun as Lee Soo-yeon: a neurosurgeon.
- Yoon Na-moo as Yuk Chan-seong: Dong-joo's father.

==== Homicide Investigation Team 3 ====
- Ahn Nae-sang as Lee Byung-man: a homicide detective and inspector.
- Choi Deok-moon as Team Leader Oh: leader of Homicide Investigation Team 3.
- Seo Jae-gyu as Kang Jae-soo: a homicide detective.

==== Others ====
- Lee Sung-wook as Lee Tae-man: chairman of Taekang Group.
  - Kim Dong-hun as young Lee Tae-man
- Choi Gwang-il as Byun Jong-il: a member of the national assembly.
- Yoon Se-woong as Choi Jong-nam: a chief prosecutor.
- Song Jae-ryong as Shin Gyeong-chul: a world-renowned film director.
- Lee Do-hyung as Na Sang-woo: the son of a professor's family who disappeared nine years ago.
- as Jeon Doo-hyun: a victim of a murder case.

=== Extended ===
- Lee Kyo-yeop as Detective Kim: a homicide detective.
- Son Ji-yoon as Myung-seok's colleague who is the editor-in-chief of the publishing company.
- Shin Yi-june as Kim Yeon-hee: a high school student.
- Woo Hyun as Noh Myung-nam
- Lee Han-wi as a school principal
- Ha Sung-kwang as Ahn Hyun-mook
- Baek Seung-cheol

== Production ==
The first script practice of the cast was held in August 2022 at the JTBC office building in Sangam-dong, Seoul.

== Viewership ==
Miraculous Brothers : South Korea viewers per episode (thousands)

Season	Episode number															
Season	1	2	3	4	5	6	7	8	9	10	11	12	13	14	15	16
1	610	655	558	630	568	649	474	629	587	582	515	N/A	501	496	569	698

Source: Audience measurement performed nationwide by Nielsen Korea.

Average TV viewership ratings
Ep.	Original broadcast date	Average audience share (Nielsen Korea)	
Ep.	Original broadcast date	Nationwide	Seoul
1	June 28, 2023	2.953% (4th)	2.863% (4th)
2	June 29, 2023	3.002% (8th)	2.739% (7th)
3	July 5, 2023	2.780% (4th)	2.615% (4th)
4	July 6, 2023	2.773% (5th)	2.726% (6th)
5	July 12, 2023	2.808% (5th)	2.935% (5th)
6	July 13, 2023	2.942% (7th)	2.705% (7th)
7	July 19, 2023	2.277% (10th)	2.088% (9th)
8	July 20, 2023	2.996% (7th)	2.641% (6th)
9	July 26, 2023	2.526% (10th)	2.334% (10th)
10	July 27, 2023	2.749% (9th)	2.450% (8th)
11	August 2, 2023	2.282% (12th)	2.217% (7th)
12	August 3, 2023	2.119% (15th)	N/A
13	August 9, 2023	2.475% (13th)	2.409% (8th)
14	August 10, 2023	2.359% (13th)	2.358% (9th)
15	August 16, 2023	2.534% (9th)	2.339% (8th)
16	August 17, 2023	3.266% (4th)	3.482% (4th)
Average		2.678%	2.593% (Note: This average rating is calculated based on the published ratings. The exact average rating is unknown due to an unpublished rating.)
In the table above, the blue numbers represent the lowest ratings and the red numbers represent the highest ratings.; N/A denotes rating that was not released.; This series aired on a cable channel/pay TV which normally has a relatively smaller audience compared to free-to-air TV/public broadcasters (KBS, SBS, MBC and EBS).

== Awards and nominations ==
Name of the award ceremony, year presented, category, nominee of the award, and the result of the nomination
Award ceremony	Year	Category	Nominee	Result	Ref.
Korea Drama Awards	2023	Global Star Award	Bae Hyun-sung	Won	
