= Lee Chung-hyun =

South Korean director and scriptwriter

- 이충현
- Born: 1990 (age 35–36); South Korea
- Education: Hankuk University of Foreign Studies (Department of Media and Communication)
- Occupations: Film director, Scriptwriter
- Years active: 2015 - present

Korean name
- Hangul: 이충현
- RR: I Chunghyeon
- MR: I Ch'unghyŏn

Lee Chung-hyun (Korean: 이충현; born 1990) is a South Korean film director. From his high school days, he has been actively involved in creating short films. In 2015, he gained recognition for his short film titled Bargain, which received positive reviews at various film festivals. Lee made his debut as a feature film director in 2020 with the Netflix thriller film The Call.

== Early life and education ==
Lee Chung-hyun was born in 1990. While he was a student at Kaywon High School of Arts, he had already made many short films and won awards at various contests, including one about the Daegu subway fire. However, instead of majoring in film, he studied journalism and broadcasting at Hankuk University of Foreign Studies, Department of Media and Communication. After graduation, he went on to work at an advertising company.

== Career ==
Lee Chung-hyun received attention for his short film Bargain, which he filmed in a single day using 5 million won of his own money. The 14-minute short features Park Hyung-soo and Lee Joo-young, portraying underage prostitution, the encounter between a middle-aged man and a high school girl on a date in Gapyeong. The entire film was shot in a single take.

The short film achieved success on the film festival circuit, receiving accolades such as the Best Short Film Award at the 11th Paris Korean Film Festival, the Special Jury Award for the Domestic Competition at the 14th Asiana International Short Film Festival, and the Best Film Award at the 15th Mise-en-scène Short Film Festival. It also received the 40,000 Blows Award for Best Action-Thriller Film, the Busan Cinephile Award, and a Special Mention from the Jury at the Busan International Short Film Festival.

Bargain's achievement also caught the attention of Yong Film, a film studio that took Lee under its wing and provided training in feature filmmaking. Syd Lim, Producer and CEO of Yong Film, recognized Lee's talent after watching his short film Bargain. Instead of immediately assigning Lee to direct his own film, Lim had him contribute to the scripts of Heart Blackened, in consultation with the film's director Jeong Ji-woo. Lee then spent several years writing screenplays for films planned or developed by Yong Film, including "Star of Judas," gaining valuable experience in various genres.

Lim produced The Call, director Lee Chung-hyun's feature film debut as a director. It is a psychological thriller film that is based on the 2011 British and Puerto Rican film The Caller, which was released in Korea in 2012. Lee took the original skeleton and extensively reworked the core elements, boldly expanding the scale to create a thrilling narrative.

The Korean adaptation stars Park Shin-hye and Jeon Jong-seo in the lead roles. The story of revolves around two women, Seo-yeon (played by Park Shin-hye) and Young-sook (played by Jeon Jong-seo), who exist in different time periods. Through a mysterious phone call, their fates become entangled, leading to a series of unexpected events. The film explores themes of destiny, connection, and the consequences of altering the course of one's life. Originally, The Call was intended for a theatrical release. However, due to the COVID-19 pandemic, the plans had to be changed, and the film's theatrical release was canceled. The film premiered on Netflix in November 2020.

Lee Chung-hyun's next project was the short film Heart Attack! It was a romantic time travel story starring Lee Sung-kyung and produced in collaboration between Samsung and Yong Film. Lee accepted Samsung's offer immediately after completing The Call. The film reunited director of photography Kim Sang-il from Bargain and the staff of The Call. Kim Sang-il was able to film the extensive storyboard within a three-day timeframe using five Galaxy phones. The story followed a woman who fell in love at first sight with a man but tragically lost him. She then turned back time to save him. The short film was exclusively released on October 6, 2020, through the OTT service Watcha.

In 2022, Lee's 2015 short film Bargain was adapted into an OTT series. Directed by Jeon Woo-sung and starring Jin Seon-kyu, Jeon Jong-seo and Chang Ryul. The series was co-produced by CJ ENM and Paramount Global, with the latter handled the global distribution outside South Korea, Japan and Taiwan. The principal photography of the series began in 2022, and it aired on TVING from October 28 to November 4, 2022.

Lee Chung-hyun teamed up once again with actress Jeon Jong-seo for his Netflix film Ballerina. Alongside Jeon Jong-seo, the film features Kim Ji-hoon and Park Yu-rim in the lead roles. The film had its premier at the 28th Busan International Film Festival in the "Korean Cinema Today – Special Premiere" section on October 5, 2023. Following its premiere, the film was made available for streaming worldwide on Netflix from October 6, 2023.

In 2024, Lee was confirmed to direct a promotional short film for the South Korean boy group Enhypen for the group's upcoming album Romance: Untold. The short film was released on June 22.

== Personal life ==
Lee Chung-hyun began a relationship with actress Jeon Jong-seo in December 2021, having met while filming The Call.

== Filmography ==
=== Short film ===
Year	Title		Credited as		Notes	Ref.
Year	English	Korean	Director	Writer	Notes	Ref.
2006	So that morning	그렇게 그날 아침은	Yes	No		
2007	Whaling, loveling	고래잡이, 사랑잡이	Yes	No		
2007	Tell Me	텔미	Yes	No	Planning	
2008	Open the window	창문을 열다	Yes	No		
2015	Bargain	몸 값	Yes	Yes	Editing	
2020	Heart Attack	하트어택	Yes	Yes		

=== Feature film ===
Year	Title		Credited as		Notes	Ref.
Year	English	Korean	Director	Writer	Notes	Ref.
2017	Heart Blackened	침묵	No	Yes		
2020	The Call	콜	Yes	Yes		
2023	Ballerina	발레리나	Yes	Yes		

== Awards and nominations ==
Awards and nominations
Awards	Year	Category	Recipient	Result	Ref.
10th Youth Film Festival	2007	Silver Best Picture	So that morning	Won	
7th Korea Youth Media Exhibition	2007	Group Bronze Award	Whale Catcher, Love Catcher	Won	
8th Korea Youth Media Festival	2008	Excellence Award	Open a Window	Won	
11th Youth Film Festival	2008	Golden Best Picture Award	Tell Me	Won	
33rd Busan International Short Film Festival	2016	Korean Competition Judge's Special Award	Bargain	Won	
33rd Busan International Short Film Festival	2016	Busan Cinephile Award	Bargain	Won	
15th Mise-en-Scène Short Film Festival	2016	40,000 Blows Award for Best Action-Thriller Film	Bargain	Won	
15th Mise-en-Scène Short Film Festival	2016	Audience Award	Bargain	Won	
17th Daegu Short Film Festival	2016	Excellence Award	Bargain	Won	
10th Great Short Film Festival	2016	Audience Award Best Picture Award	Bargain	Won	
10th Great Short Film Festival	2016	Audience Award Title Award	Bargain	Won	
8th Seoul International Extreme-Short Image and Film Festival (SESIFF)	2016	Excellence Award	Bargain	Won	
11th Paris Korean Film Festival	2016	Best Film Award	Bargain	Won	
14th Asiana International Short Film Festival	2016	Special Judge's Award for Domestic Competition	Bargain	Won	
57th Baeksang Arts Awards	2021	Best New Director	The Call	Nominated	
30th Buil Film Awards	2021	Best New Director	The Call	Nominated	
26th Chunsa Film Art Awards	2021	Best New Director	The Call	Nominated	
42nd Blue Dragon Film Awards	2021	Best New Director	The Call	Nominated	
20th Director's Cut Awards	2022	Best New Director	The Call	Nominated	
