= The Chase (2017 film) =

- Poster
- Hangul: 반드시 잡는다
- RR: Bandeusi jamneunda
- MR: Pandŭsi chamnŭnda
- Directed by: Kim Hong-seon
- Screenplay by: Yoo Kap-jeol
- Based on: Aridong Last Cowboy (webtoon)
- Produced by: Hwang Sung-gil
- Starring: Baek Yoon-sik; Sung Dong-il; Bae Jong-ok; Kim Hye-in; Chun Ho-jin; Park Hyung-soo
- Production company: AD406
- Distributed by: Next Entertainment World
- Release date: November 29, 2017
- Running time: 110 minutes
- Country: South Korea
- Language: Korean
- Box office: US$1.4 million

The Chase (Korean: 반드시 잡는다; RR: Bandeusi jamneunda; lit. 'No Matter What, I'll Catch You') is a 2017 South Korean crime thriller film about a landowner who teams up with a former detective to chase after the suspect of a 30-year-old unsolved case. The film was directed by Kim Hong-seon and stars Baek Yoon-sik, Sung Dong-il, Bae Jong-ok, Kim Hye-in, Chun Ho-jin, and Park Hyung-soo.

== Plot ==
Shim Deok-su is a grumpy landlord of several working-class flats who constantly harasses his tenants for rent. A Korean War refugee from the north, he possesses a Scrooge-like reputation and is widely despised about town. At the beginning of the movie we see him begin his day by dropping in on Mr Choi, a hard-up tenant who has been suffering from ailments that prevent him from working, to demand rent just as the latter is being visited by charity workers from a local church. Unmoved by the volunteers' pleas for empathy and unperturbed by their subsequent attempts to guilt-trip him, Deok-su leaves to go about his chores. As he goes about his routine he comes across two dead bodies as they are being cleared by police, one of a local drunk and the other a pensioner living alone.

In the evening Deok-su revisits Mr Choi, who has prepared an extravagant dinner in anticipation of a former colleague's visit. The two men eat, and during the ensuing conversation, Mr Choi reveals himself to have been a former police detective and opines that the two deaths Deok-su had encountered earlier were murders committed by someone who was likely practising on the elderly prior to moving on to young women.

Mr Choi's theory is soon proven correct. That same night he is murdered by an unseen assailant who covers up his crime, arranging Mr Choi's body as a suicide. Meanwhile, another murder takes place just a few units down the corridor. Ji-Eun, a chaste young worker at a nearby textile mill who is another tenant of Deok-su's, returns to find her roommate murdered, the young woman's throat has been slit. Unbeknownst to her, the murderer has yet to leave the flat; he bashes her head and kidnaps her.

The entire neighborhood blames Deok-su for Mr Choi's death based on the earlier encounter with the church workers. The only person who doesn't believe this is Mr Choi's former partner, retired Detective Pyung-Dal, who shows up a day late. Pyung-Dal digs up proof that Mr Choi was far from suicidal and shares with Deok-su details concerning a string of similar murders of pensioners and young women that had taken place thirty years before. Realizing that Ji-Eun fits the profile of the victims Pyung-Dal had been describing, Deok-su rushes back to her apartment to check in on her.

After a run-in with a gang of youthful thugs — one of whom happens to be the lover of the murdered young lady — Deok-su and Pyung-Dal enters Ji-Eun's apartment, where they promptly discovered the severed head of Ji-Eun's roommate in her refrigerator. The former detective surmises that Ji-Eun must have been kidnapped and convinces Deok-su not to inform the police lest they put the missing woman's life in danger. The two men then team up to track down the kidnapper and rescue Ji-Eun.

After the police closes the case, Deok-Su continues his investigation and finds out from the last surviving victim that the killer has a scar in his finger and he also has overwhelming odor. Deok-Su then realizes that Jung-Hyuk has the same odor so he suspects that Pyung-Dal might not wrong after all. He then goes to the doctor's house and pretend to ask for health checkup. After Deok-Su recognizes the scar in his finger, Jung-Hyuk realizes the jinx it up and knocks Deok-Su out.

In his secret barn, Jung-Hyuk reveals that he is indeed the serial killer decades ago and he kidnapped Ji-Eun to replace his sick wife by paralyzing her as well. He then further states that Doo-Sik is just a copycat of his works and he was the one that killed Doo-Sik with the car to prevent his crimes from being exposed. Just as he is about to paralyze Ji-Eun, Pyung-Dal escapes from the asylum with a real gun and shoot off Jung-Hyuk's ear. The two men fight and Jung-Hyuk shoot both Pyung-Dal and his wife dead. He then chases Deok-So and Ji-Eun at the construction side but eventually being subdued by the combined force of Deok-So and the police officer who previously mistakes him for the killer, leading to Jung-Hyuk's arrest. Later on, Jung-Hyuk is sentenced to death.

Deok-Su eventually starts dating after the ordeal.

== Cast ==
- Baek Yoon-sik as Shim Deok-su, a grumpy landlord
- Sung Dong-il as Park Pyung-dal, a former detective and Mr.Choi's old friend
  - Jung Sung-il as young pyung-dal
- Chun Ho-jin as Na Jung-hyuk
  - Wi Ha-joon as young Jung-hyuk
- Bae Jong-ok as Min Young-Sook, the only survivor from the murderer 30 yeaes ago
  - Jung Yoo-min as young Yeong-sook
- Jo Dal-hwan as Police officer Lee
- Kim Hye-in as Kim Ji-eun, the girl who lived in Deok-su's apartment
- Park Hyung-soo as Bae Doo-sik
- Son Jong-hak as Mr. Choi, a former detective
  - Jo Hyun-sik as young Mr. Choi
- Lee Kan-hee as Jung-hyuk's wife
- Park Ji-hyun as Kim Soo-kyung, Ji-eun's friend
- Kim Si-young as Caregiver
- Kang Mal-geum as Caregiver 2
- Oh Chi-woon as President Song
- Lee Kwang-se as Jeong Man-hong
- Lee Min-woong as Pyung-dal's son
- Lee Jeong-eun as Ji-eun's mom
- Kim Hyun as Factory woman
- Son Seong-chan as Police chief
- Oh Hee-joon as Gangster
- Yoo Jae-myung as Detective Go

== Release ==
=== Box office ===
The Chase was released in South Korea on November 29, 2017.
