= Bang Jae-ho =

South Korean actor

Seo Jae-woo
- Born: Bang Jae-ho; 21 June 1992 (age 34); Seoul, South Korea
- Education: Hankuk University of Foreign Studies Seoul Campus (Department of Chinese)
- Occupations: Actor; model
- Years active: 2016–present
- Agent: Big Whale Entertainment
- Known for: The King in Love; Grand Prince; The Third Charm

Korean name
- Hangul: 방재호
- RR: Bang Jaeho
- MR: Pang Chaeho

Stage name
- Hangul: 서재우
- RR: Seo Jaeu
- MR: Sŏ Chaeu

Bang Jae-ho (Korean: 방재호; born June 21, 1992) known professionally as Seo Jae-woo (서재우) is a South Korean actor and model. He is best known for his roles in dramas The King in Love, The Third Charm, School 2021 and Grand Prince. He also appeared in movies such as The Bad Guys: Reign of Chaos and Birthday.

== Early life ==
He was born on June 21, 1992, in Seoul, South Korea. He completed his studies from Hankuk University of Foreign Studies Seoul Campus, he studied Chinese.

== Career ==
After he graduated, he made his debut as an actor in 2016 and he also worked as an advertising model and he appeared in Samsung Galaxy S4 ZOOM and Maxim. After his debut as an actor, he appeared in a number of dramas such as The King in Love, Between Friendship and Love, Grand Prince and The Third Charm. He also appeared in movies Birthday and The Bad Guys: Reign of Chaos.

== Filmography ==
=== Television series ===
Year	Title	Role	Ref.
2016	Between Friendship and Love	Woo-jung	
2017	The King in Love	Jin-gwan	
2018	KBS Drama Special – "Forgotten Season"	Kim Woo-hyun	
2018	Grand Prince	Park Gi-teuk	
2018	The Third Charm	Jae-woo	
2021	School 2021	Chul-Joo Jeong	
2023	My Lovely Liar	Lee Young-jae	
2023	Korea–Khitan War	Kim Jong-hyeon	
2024	Missing Crown Prince	Moo Baek	
2024	My R-rated First Love	Cha Si-hyeok	
2025	Virtual On Air	Han Ji-hyeok	

=== Film ===
Year	Title	Role	Ref.
2019	Birthday	Birthday party boy	
2019	The Bad Guys: Reign of Chaos	Young police officer	
2020	More Than Family	Mediator	
2024	Holy Punch	Detective Jo	
