= The Call (2020 South Korean film) =

2020 South Korean film

- Promotional poster
- Hangul: 콜
- RR: Kol
- MR: K'ol
- Directed by: Lee Chung-hyun
- Written by: Lee Chung-hyun
- Based on: The Caller by Sergio Casci
- Produced by: Syd Lim; Jeong Hui-sun
- Starring: Park Shin-hye; Jeon Jong-seo; Kim Sung-ryung; Lee El
- Cinematography: Jo Young-jik
- Edited by: Yang Jin-mo
- Music by: Dalpalan
- Production company: Yong Film
- Distributed by: Next Entertainment World; Netflix
- Release date: November 27, 2020
- Running time: 112 minutes
- Country: South Korea
- Language: Korean

The Call (Korean: 콜; RR: Kol), is a 2020 South Korean science fiction psychological thriller film directed by Lee Chung-hyun, starring Park Shin-hye and Jeon Jong-seo. Based on the 2011 British and Puerto Rican film The Caller, The Call revolves around Seo-yeon (Park Shin-hye) and Young-sook (Jeon Jong-seo), two women from different times who connect through a phone call that interchanges their fates. The film was originally going to be released theatrically, but was cancelled due to the COVID-19 pandemic. It was released on Netflix globally on November 27, 2020.

== Plot ==
In 2019, 28-year-old Kim Seo-yeon visits her sick, estranged mother, Eun-ae, in a rural area. Arriving at her rundown childhood home, she finds a decades-old cordless phone, and through it receives calls from a distressed woman who says she's being tortured by her mother. After investigating the house, she figures out that the woman on the phone, Oh Young-sook, is living in the same house but in 1999. The two are able to communicate across time through the phone, and get to know each other. Both have troubled relationships with their mothers: Young-sook is orphaned and lives with her adoptive mother, a stern, domineering woman who is a shaman; Seo-yeon, whose father died in 1999, blames her mother for the fire that killed him.

Young-sook, acting on information from Seo-yeon, sneaks out to prevent the fire that killed Seo-yeon's father. She is successful, and Seo-yeon's reality changes - her parents are both alive and healthy, and their house is lavish. Young-sook, however, is punished by her mother for her disobedience, and becomes resentful that Seo-yeon's life has improved while hers is becoming more miserable.

Seo-yeon later learns online that Young-sook was killed by her mother during an exorcism. She warns Young-sook, who saves herself as her mother explains that she must kill her as her fortune reveals multiple deaths. Young-sook then kills her mother, who turns out to be right in her prediction - now freed, Young-sook becomes a serial killer. Seo-yeon realizes what has happened when Young-sook's victims disappear in the present day. During a phone call, she inadvertently reveals that Young-sook will be arrested.

In 1999, Young-sook is visited by 8-year-old Seo-yeon and her father, who have come to the house to close their purchase of it. She kills Seo-yeon's father and takes young Seo-yeon captive. In 2019, Seo-yeon's reality changes again - her father is dead and the house in even worse condition. Young-sook tells Seo-yeon to find out how she'll be arrested. Seo-yeon feeds her false information, but when Young-sook threatens to kill Eun-ae next, Seo-yeon breaks into the local police station to steal the police notebook that was used in 1999. Young-sook taunts that they're the same when she reveals that it was Seo-yeon who caused the fire that originally killed her father; she had lied about Eun-ae being responsible.

Seo-yeon gives Young-sook the correct information, and her reality changes again - the house is now owned by an older Young-sook, who has continued as a serial killer. The content of the notebook changes as well, with a note that Eun-ae came to the house with a police officer. Seo-yeon waits in the house and warns the 1999 Eun-ae of Young-sook.

In 1999, Young-sook kills the police officer and chases Eun-ae. In 2019, older Young-sook similarly chases Seo-yeon. Eun-ae seemingly sacrifices herself to protect little Seo-yeon and kill Young-sook, and 2019 changes again, with the house becoming derelict and old Young-sook disappearing. Seo-yeon is reunited with Eun-ae, who is alive and well, albeit with scars.

In a mid-credit scene, older Young-sook calls her younger counterpart to warn her about Eun-ae and the police officer, allowing Young-sook to alter her own history. This results in the erasure of Eun-ae from present day Seo-yeon's side. The scene cuts to the torture room, where a person tied to a chair is screaming for help. It is a frightened adult Seo-yeon, once again a captive of Young-sook.

== Cast ==
- Park Shin-hye as Kim Seo-yeon
- Jeon Jong-seo as Oh Young-sook
- Kim Sung-ryung as Eun-ae, Seo-yeon's mother.
- Lee El as Ja-ok, Young-sook's mother
- Oh Jung-se as Seong-ho
- Lee Dong-hwi as Baek Mi-hyun
- Park Ho-san as Mr. Kim (Seo-yeon's father)
- Park Hyung-soo as Man-voice
- Um Chae Young as Young Seon-hee

== Production ==
Principal photography began on January 3, 2019, and wrapped on April 2, 2019.

== Reception ==
On the review aggregation website Rotten Tomatoes, the film holds an approval rating of 100% based on 12 reviews, with an average rating of 7.1/10.

Jade Budowski of Decider gave the film a positive review and wrote, "With an original concept, chilling kills, and stunning performances, The Call is more than worth picking up."

== Awards and nominations ==
Year	Awards	Category	Recipient	Result	Ref.
2021	57th Baeksang Arts Awards	Best Actress (Film)	Jeon Jong-seo	Won	
2021	57th Baeksang Arts Awards	Best New Director	Lee Chung-hyun	Nominated	
2021	30th Buil Film Awards	Best New Director	Lee Chung-hyun	Nominated	
2021	30th Buil Film Awards	Best Actress	Jeon Jong-seo	Won	
2021	15th Asian Film Awards	Best Actress	Jeon Jong-seo	Nominated	
2021	26th Chunsa Film Art Awards	Best Actress	Jeon Jong-seo	Nominated	
2021	26th Chunsa Film Art Awards	Best New Director	Lee Chung-hyun	Nominated	
2021	42nd Blue Dragon Film Awards	Best New Director	Lee Chung-hyun	Nominated	
2021	42nd Blue Dragon Film Awards	Best Actress	Jeon Jong-seo	Nominated	
2022	20th Director's Cut Awards	Best Actress	Jeon Jong-seo	Won	
2022	20th Director's Cut Awards	Best New Actress	Jeon Jong-seo	Nominated	
2022	20th Director's Cut Awards	Best New Director	Lee Chung-hyun	Nominated	
