= Tristes Tropiques (film) =

2025 South Korean film

- Theatrical release poster
- Hangul: 슬픈 열대
- Lit.: Sad Tropical
- RR: Seulpeun yeoldae
- MR: Sŭlp'ŭn yŏltae
- Directed by: Park Hoon-jung
- Written by: Park Hoon-jung
- Produced by: Park Hoon-jung; Jang Kyung-ik
- Starring: Lee Shin-young; Park Yu-rim; Kim Myung-min; Park Hae-soo; Austin Lin; Chen Yi-wen; Wang Po-chieh
- Cinematography: Kim Young-ho
- Edited by: Jang Jae-won
- Music by: Mowg
- Production companies: Goldmoon Film; Studio&NEW
- Distributed by: Mindmark
- Release dates: October 16, 2025 (Sitges); November 25, 2026 (South Korea)
- Running time: 118 minutes
- Country: South Korea
- Language: Korean

Tristes Tropiques (Korean: 슬픈 열대; lit. 'Sad Tropics') is a 2025 South Korean action thriller film written and directed by Park Hoon-jung, starring Lee Shin-young, Park Yu-rim, Kim Myung-min, and Park Hae-soo. The film premiered at the 58th Sitges Film Festival on October 16, 2025. It is scheduled to be released in South Korea on November 25, 2026.

== Synopsis ==
It tells the story of children belonging to a killer organization called "Sad Tropics," raised by the "Master," the ultimate ruler of the rainforest. Following the Master's murder, tensions and suspicions emerge among the organization's members. Meanwhile, his longtime associates begin maneuvering to seize his vacant position.

== Cast ==
- Lee Shin-young as Lu, a boy abandoned in the jungle as a child. He was born deaf but survived as the youngest member of Tristes Tropiques organization.
- Park Yu-rim as Jojo, a girl who followed Master into the jungle on her own
- Kim Myung-min as Master, ruler of Tristes Tropiques organization which specializes in jungle warfare
- Park Hae-soo as Jang, the eldest member of the Tristes Tropiques organization
- Austin Lin as Rain, the organization's second-in-command who left Tristes Tropiques
- Chen Yi-wen as Peng, a business partner who co-founded the organization alongside the Master and serves as its overall manager
- Wang Po-chieh as the new boss of Chinatown

== Production ==
=== Development ===
On July 17, 2024, Mindmark unveiled its film lineup for 2024 and 2025, featuring director Park Hoon-jung's latest work, with the working title Seulpeun Yeoldae (슬픈 열대; 'Sad Tropical'). The film is produced by Park's production company, Gold Moon Film, and co-produced by Mindmark, a content subsidiary of the Shinsegae Group, and Next Entertainment World's subsidiary Studio&NEW. Described as a project offering a new level of complexity and depth, the production held auditions with plans to begin principal photography in Thailand in September 2024.

The official English title was later confirmed to be Tristes Tropiques.

=== Marketing ===
International sales rights was secured by Finecut. They introduced the project to buyers in Toronto.

=== Casting ===
In October 2024, it was reported that director Park Hoon-jung's new film had finalized its primary cast and commenced principal photography. The leading cast includes Kim Myung-min, Lee Shin-young, Park Yu-rim, Austin Lin, and Park Hae-soo.

=== Filming ===
The principal photography was located in Thailand and run from September to December 2024.

== Release ==
Tristes Tropiques was invited to the Orbita competition section of the 58th Sitges Film Festival. The film had its world premiere at the festival's main 1,380-seat auditorium. It had its Belgian premiere at the 44th Brussels International Fantastic Film Festival (BIFFF) on April 17, 2026, where it was screened at Brussels Expo (Palais 10) as part of the international competition. The film is scheduled for release in South Korea in 2026.

The film was selected as the Closing Night film for the London Korean Film Festival on November 16th at BFI Southbank, making it its UK premiere and with director Park Hoon-jung in attendance.

== Accolades ==
Award	Date of ceremony	Category	Recipient(s)	Result	Ref.
Brussels International Fantastic Film Festival	April 18, 2026	Silver Raven	Tristes Tropiques (Note: shared the Silver Raven with Matt Johnson's comedy Nirvanna the Band the Show the Movie)	Won	
32nd L'Etrange Festival	September 16, 2026	Nouveau Genre Grand Prize	Tristes Tropiques	Won	
Sitges Film Festival	October 18, 2025	Best feature film in the Òrbita section	Tristes Tropiques	Nominated	
