= Black Dog: Being A Teacher =

2019 South Korean television series

- Promotional poster
- Hangul: 블랙독
- Lit.: Black Dog
- RR: Beullaekdok
- MR: Pŭllaektok
- Genre: Drama
- Created by: Studio Dragon
- Written by: Park Joo-yun
- Directed by: Hwang Joon-hyeok
- Starring: Seo Hyun-jin; Ra Mi-ran; Ha Jun
- Country of origin: South Korea
- Original language: Korean
- No. of episodes: 16

Production
- Camera setup: Single-camera
- Production company: Urban Works Media

Original release
- Network: tvN
- Release: December 16, 2019 – February 4, 2020

Black Dog: Being A Teacher (Korean: 블랙독; RR: Beullaekdok) is a 2019–2020 South Korean television series starring Seo Hyun-jin, Ra Mi-ran and Ha Jun. It aired on tvN's Mondays and Tuesdays time slot from December 16, 2019 to February 4, 2020. It is a well-made drama in which viewers sympathized greatly with the realistic situation, conflicts and villains facing fixed-term teachers in the drama.

== Synopsis ==
Go Ha-neul (Seo Hyun-jin) becomes a temporary teacher at a private school, but she faces many struggles in her new position. However, she's determined to do her best and help her students as they face the various trials that exist in the highly competitive private school setting. With the guidance of Park Sung-soon (Ra Mi-ran), the head of the school's career counseling department, and Do Yeon-woo (Ha Jun), a Korean language teacher with an unwavering passion for teaching, Go Ha-neul finds the strength to overcome the challenges of teaching in today's cutthroat education system, growing both as a person and a teacher.

== Cast ==
=== Main ===
- Seo Hyun-jin as Go Ha-neul

After a teacher saved her when she was a student, Ha-neul decided to become one herself. Years later, she starts working as a temporary teacher at a private high school and, through struggles, grows as a teacher and as a person. She is also the niece of the member of the Academic Affair Department, which making her being scorned for alleged nepotism.

- Ra Mi-ran as Park Sung-soon

An experienced teacher who becomes Ha-neul's mentor. She is a Korean language teacher and Head of College Admission, and is known as a workaholic among the students. Initially, she dislikes Ha-neul as she believes Han-neul got the job through family connection due to her uncle being part of the Academic Affair Department.

- Ha Jun as Do Yeon-woo

A Korean language teacher who is very popular among students.

=== Supporting ===
- Lee Chang-hoon as Bae Myeong-soo
- Baek Eun-hye as Song Chan-hee
- Lee Hang-na as Song Young-sook
- Jung Hae-kyun as Moon Soo-ho
- Kim Hong-pa as Byeon Seong-joo
- Yoo Min-kyu as Ji Hae-won
- Park Ji-hwan as Song Yeong-tae
- Lee Eun-saem as Jin Yoo-ra
- Jo Yeon-hee as Kim Yi-boon
- Lee Yoon-hee as Lee Seung-taek
- Heo Tae-hee as Ha Soo-hyeon
- Ye Soo-jung as Yoon Yeo-hwa
- Park Yu-rim as Ryu Jin-hee

=== Special appearances ===
- Ryu Ji-eun as young Go Ha-neul
- Tae In-ho as Kim Young-ha, Ha Neul's former high school teacher (Ep.1-2)
- Woo Mi-hwa as Han Jae-hee (Math and creative experience teacher)

== Ratings ==
Black Dog: Being A Teacher : South Korea viewers per episode (thousands)

| Season | Episode number | | | | | | | | | | | | | | | | Average |
| Season | 1 | 2 | 3 | 4 | 5 | 6 | 7 | 8 | 9 | 10 | 11 | 12 | 13 | 14 | 15 | 16 | Average |
|---|---|---|---|---|---|---|---|---|---|---|---|---|---|---|---|---|---|
| 1 | 694 | 968 | 1031 | 971 | 1211 | 1096 | 1044 | 1067 | 943 | 904 | 942 | 1124 | 873 | 936 | 867 | 990 | 979 |

Source: Audience measurement performed nationwide by Nielsen Media Research.

Average TV viewership ratings
| Ep. | Original broadcast date | Average audience share (AGB Nielsen) | |
| Ep. | Original broadcast date | Nationwide | Seoul |
|---|---|---|---|
| 1 | December 16, 2019 | 3.331% | 3.574% |
| 2 | December 17, 2019 | 4.412% | 5.064% |
| 3 | December 23, 2019 | 4.411% | 5.212% |
| 4 | December 24, 2019 | 4.349% | 4.834% |
| 5 | December 30, 2019 | 5.483% | 6.004% |
| 6 | December 31, 2019 | 4.732% | 5.126% |
| 7 | January 6, 2020 | 4.797% | 4.848% |
| 8 | January 7, 2020 | 5.055% | 5.352% |
| 9 | January 13, 2020 | 4.393% | 4.941% |
| 10 | January 14, 2020 | 4.339% | 4.457% |
| 11 | January 20, 2020 | 4.492% | 4.744% |
| 12 | January 21, 2020 | 5.085% | 5.563% |
| 13 | January 27, 2020 | 3.983% | 4.026% |
| 14 | January 28, 2020 | 4.428% | 4.662% |
| 15 | February 3, 2020 | 4.110% | 4.261% |
| 16 | February 4, 2020 | 4.658% | 4.647% |
| Average | | 4.504% | 4.832% |
In the table above, the blue numbers represent the lowest ratings and the red numbers represent the highest ratings.; This drama aired on a cable channel/pay TV which normally has a relatively smaller audience compared to free-to-air TV/public broadcasters (KBS, SBS, MBC and EBS).
