= Ballerina (2023 film) =

2023 South Korean action thriller film

- Promotional poster
- Hangul: 발레리나
- RR: Ballerina
- MR: Pallerina
- Directed by: Lee Chung-hyun
- Written by: Lee Chung-hyun
- Produced by: Byun Seung-min
- Starring: Jeon Jong-seo; Kim Ji-hoon; Park Yu-rim
- Cinematography: Cho Young-jik
- Edited by: Cho Han-ul
- Music by: Gray
- Production company: Climax Studio
- Distributed by: Netflix
- Release dates: October 5, 2023 (BIFF); October 6, 2023 (Netflix)
- Running time: 93 minutes
- Country: South Korea
- Language: Korean

Ballerina (Korean: 발레리나), is a 2023 South Korean action thriller film written and directed by Lee Chung-hyun. The film stars Jeon Jong-seo, Kim Ji-hoon and Park Yu-rim in the lead roles. It premiered at the 28th Busan International Film Festival in the 'Korean Cinema Today – Special Premiere' section on October 5, 2023. Ballerina streamed globally on Netflix from October 6, 2023.

== Plot ==
Jang Ok-ju, a former bodyguard for VIP clients, discovers that her best friend Choi Min-hee has committed suicide and her last wish to Ok-ju is to get revenge on sex trafficker Choi Pro, who victimized Min-hee by filming her and extorting money and sex from her. Ok-ju searches for Choi through his internet profile and finds his address. She watches Choi from afar, seeing him sell some sort of drug to various customers. When he finishes and heads home, Ok-ju follows. The following morning Ok-ju breaks into Choi's home and plants listening devices. Ok-ju also discovers a drawer full of USB drives, each labeled with nicknames or descriptions. Ok-ju finds Choi Min-hee's USB drive labeled "ballerina" and sees a video of Choi assaulting an unconscious Min-hee. Ok-ju is devastated. A few days later, Ok-ju learns that Choi will be at a nightclub named Heaven and goes there to meet him. Choi approaches her with a pick-up line and Ok-ju buys him a drink. They eventually leave the nightclub and Choi takes her to the hotel where Min-hee was filmed.

Choi attempts to drug Ok-ju and Ok-ju pretends to ingest the drug. However, when Choi begins filming Ok-ju and starts his assault on her, she tries to stab him. The two fight and eventually Ok-ju gets the upper hand but, before she can kill him, she is attacked by hotel staff. Ok-ju is helped by a high school student who was kept at the hotel as a sex slave, and the two escape in Choi's Lamborghini.

The leader of Choi's gang expresses disappointment in Choi, stating that the gang trafficked in drugs and prostitutes, but that he had never given Choi permission to drug women and make "weird" pornographic movies. The leader orders Choi to bring Ok-ju to him within three days. Choi visits the pharmacist who makes the drug he uses to render his victims unconscious. He tells the pharmacist that the two of them will track Ok-ju down; when the pharmacist expresses hesitation due to not being a hitman, Choi promises to pay him one-hundred million won.

The following day, Ok-ju reaches out to an old friend to procure some weapons. Meanwhile, Choi and the pharmacist track down the stolen Lamborghini through a corrupt police contact. In the evening Ok-ju goes out to a convenience store. Upon returning to her apartment, she discovers the high school student is gone, and Choi and the pharmacist attack her. Ok-ju flees through the window.

Choi lies to the leader of his gang, saying that he has killed Ok-ju and buried her body in the mountains. The gang leader orders Choi to kill the high school student as Choi has stated she saw him kill Ok-ju; instead, Choi and the pharmacist torture the student to learn Ok-ju's whereabouts. In an attempt to find the student, Ok-ju visits the hotel and learns the location of the base of operations of Choi's gang. There she ends up killing all its members when no one will tell her where Choi is. As Ok-ju is leaving, she comes across the pharmacist driving a golf cart with the student's body in the back. As Ok-ju is about to shoot the pharmacist, she herself is shot by Choi. The pharmacist then states that he will kill Ok-ju for the 100,000,000 won, but Choi shoots him in the back of the head. However, before Choi can kill Ok-ju, the high school student awakens and fires several shots at Choi. None of the shots hit, but Choi is distracted long enough for Ok-ju to shoot him several times. Ok-ju and the high school student take Choi to the beach and burn him to death. Ok-ju then goes to Choi's house and removes the USB drives containing the videos of his victims; she also discovers a notebook showing the names of Choi's customers. She takes the notebook and drives off into the sunset.

== Cast ==
- Jeon Jong-seo as Jang Ok-ju, a former bodyguard
- Kim Ji-hoon as Choi Pro
- Park Yu-rim as Choi Min-hee, Ok-ju's bestfriend
- Shin Se-hwi as a female student
- Park Hyung-soo as Myeong-sik
- Kim Mu-yeol as Chief Jo
- Jang Yoon-ju as Mun-yeong
- Kim Young-ok as gun dealer
- Joo Hyun as gun dealer
- Park Hyoung-soo

== Production ==
In April 2022, confirming the production of Ballerina, Netflix announced the cast and crew of the film. Directed by Lee Chung-hyun and produced by Climax Studio, it has Jeon Jong-seo, Kim Ji-hoon, and Park Yu-rim as main cast, while music is composed by Gray. Principal photography commenced in June 2022, and filming was wrapped up in late October in the same year. This film also marks the reunion of Jeon Jong-seo, Kim Ji-hoon and Jang Yoon-ju after working together in the series Money Heist Korea: Joint Economic Area.

In January 2023, Netflix announced its lineup of Korean upcoming films and Ballerina was listed as among the 6 Korean movies being added on the platform.

=== Music ===
Gray composed the music of the film.

== Soundtrack ==
Ballerina

Soundtrack album by Gray
- Released: October 6, 2023
- Recorded: 2022–23
- Genre: Soundtrack
- Length: 43:54
- Languages: Korean; English
- Labels: Genie Music; Stone Music Entertainment; Netflix
Audio Full Album
- Ballerina OST on YouTube

There are 15 tracks in the album:
No.	Title	Lyrics	Artist	Length
1.	"HIGH SCORE. PIROUETTE"			2:20
2.	"BALLERINA"	Gray; DeVita	DeVita	1:09
3.	"I GOT BLOOD. POINTSHOES. ON THE SWING"			2:00
4.	"NIGHT RIDER. BAD MEETS EVIL. BOSS. SMELLS WEIRD. GOOGLE MAP"			2:13
5.	"BITTERSWEET TRAGEDY"	Gray; Jambino	Jambino	3:02
6.	"SHOWTIME"		DeVita	0:52
7.	"INTO THE FOREST. DON′T OPEN. NIGHTMARE"			4:24
8.	"BALLON. PHARMACY. BEFORE THE SHOW"		DeVita	3:18
9.	"THIS IS HOW WE DO IT"	Gray; Woo Won-jae	Woo Won-jae	2:27
10.	"GRAND PAS DE DEUX"			3:26
11.	"BLACK FRIDAY. DEAD OR ALIVE. HATE. CON BRIO. ADAGIO"			6:38
12.	"CHECKMATE"	Gray; DeVita	DeVita	2:26
13.	"CODA"			2:23
14.	"KALEIDOSCOPE. POISSON. ON MY HANDS"			3:45
15.	"BLOOD ON MY HANDS"	Gray; Paul Blanco; DeVita	Paul Blanco; DeVita	3:31
Total length:				43:54

== Release ==
The film had its premiere at the 28th Busan International Film Festival in 'Korean Cinema Today – Special Premiere' section on October 5, 2023. It is available for streaming from October 6 on Netflix globally.

== Reception ==
=== Audience response ===
Ballerina from October 9 to 15 had 14.7 million views and 23.1 million hours of viewing. It was at 1st place in Global Top 10 weekly list of the most-watched Netflix TV films (Non-English).

=== Critical response ===
On the review aggregator Rotten Tomatoes website, the film has an approval rating of 91% based on 11 reviews, with an average rating of 6.6/10.

James Marsh of South China Morning Post rated the film 3/5 and criticized the script but praised the performance of Jeon Jong-seo writing, "While the script offers precious little invention beneath its polished surface, Jeon's cold-as-ice angel of vengeance is the film's saving grace". Marsh opined that the director Lee should have explored the depths of Ok-ju's (Jeon Jong-seo) relationship with Min-hee (Park Yu-rim) further. He said that if their relationship had been "more than just platonic, the film might have been a genuine game-changer." He concluded, "As is, Ballerina is a polished yet disposable slice of ho-hum hokum".

Rohan Naahar of The Indian Express rated the film with 3 stars out of 5 and wrote, "Neon visuals and a thumping soundtrack elevate Netflix's slickly packaged Korean revenge thriller that substitutes plot in favour of pure vibes." Kim Jun-mo reviewing for OhmyNews criticized the direction of the film, writing that though "there are eye-catching mise-en-scenes and momentary sense", but "the power to lead the entire play smoothly leaves something to be desired". Kim concluded, "Ballerina was a work that left a disappointing impression on the growth of a promising Chungmu-ro star who had received attention for her fresh attempts, wild imagination, and unique world view."

=== Accolades ===
Award	Year	Category	Recipient(s)	Result	Ref.
Blue Dragon Film Awards	2023	Best Music	Gray	Nominated	
Blue Dragon Film Awards	2023	Best Art Direction	Kim Min-hye	Nominated	
