= Kim Hye-in =

South Korean actress (born 1993)

- Born: January 16, 1993 (age 33); South Korea
- Education: Ewha Womans University
- Occupation: Actress
- Years active: 2015–present
- Agent: SBD Entertainment
- Spouse: Song Seung-ho (m. 2022)

Korean name
- Hangul: 김혜인
- RR: Gim Hyein
- MR: Kim Hyein

Kim Hye-in (Korean: 김혜인; born January 16, 1993) is a South Korean actress. She is perhaps best known for her role in the television series Hospital Playlist (2020–2021).

== Life and career ==
In July 2012, Kim was crowned World Miss University Korea while she was majoring in dance at the Ewha Womans University.

She made her acting debut in the film The Throne (2015) and has since appeared in the television series Entourage (2016), Hospital Playlist (2020–2021), which is one of the highest-rated Korean series in cable television history, and She Would Never Know (2021).

== Filmography ==
=== Film ===
Year	Title	Role	Notes	Ref.
2015	The Throne	Queen candidate	Bit part	
2017	The Chase	Kim Ji-eun		

=== Television ===
Year	Title	Network	Role	Notes	Ref.
2016	Entourage	tvN	Seo Ji-an		
2017	Drama Stage: "The Picnic Day"	tvN	Min-joo		
2020–2021	Hospital Playlist	tvN	Myung Eun-won	2 seasons	
2021	She Would Never Know	JTBC	Kang Soo-mi		
2021	Yumi's Cells	tvN	Hong Na-ri	Guest (episodes 7–8)	
2025	Resident Playbook	tvN	Myung Eun-won		
