= Jeon Jong-seo =

South Korean actress

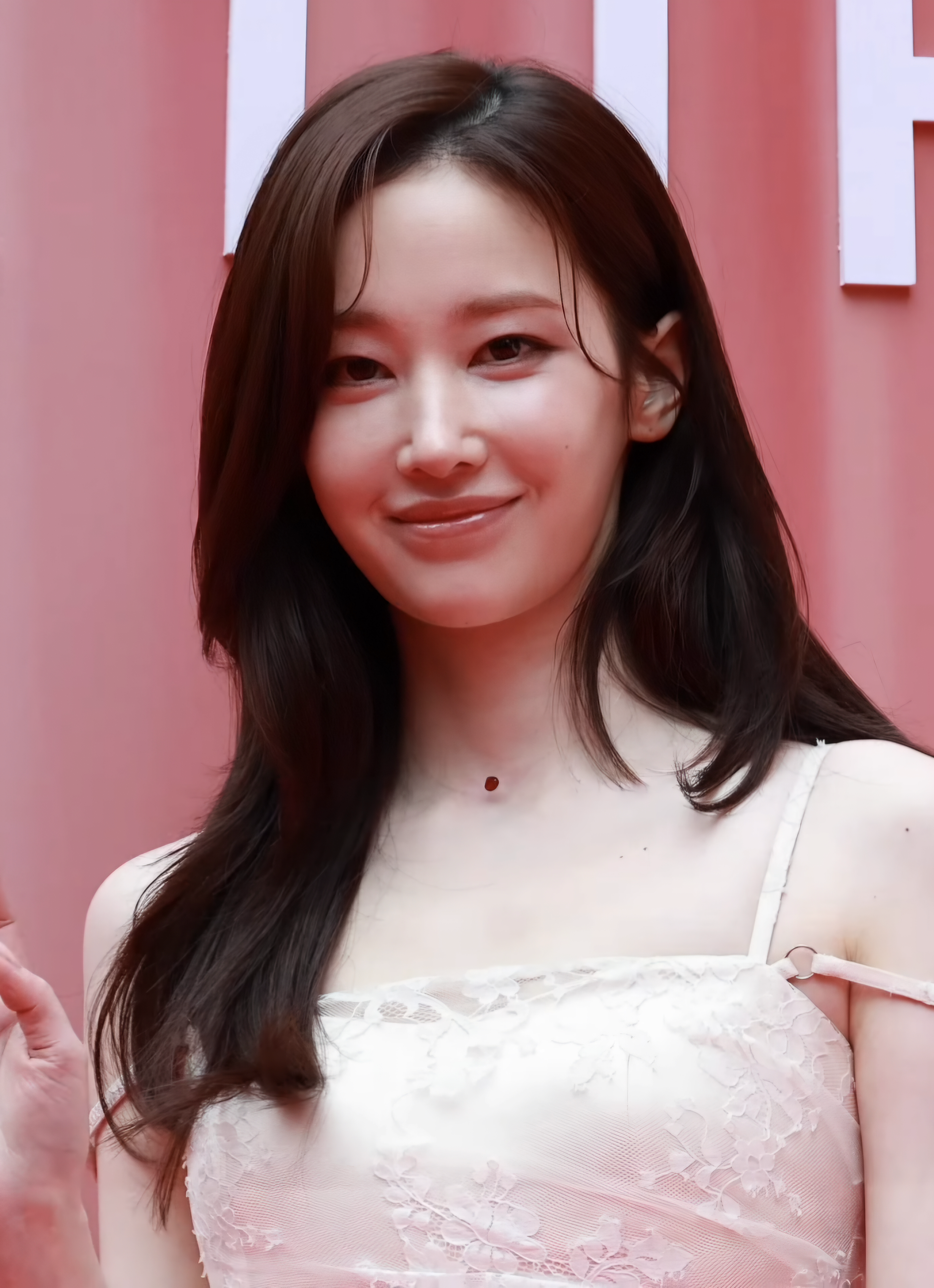
- Jeon in May 2025
- Born: Seoul, South Korea
- Other name: Rachel Jun
- Education: Anyang Arts High School
- Occupations: Actress; brand ambassador
- Years active: 2018–present
- Agents: Andmarq; United Talent Agency

Korean name
- Hangul: 전종서
- Hanja: 全鐘瑞
- RR: Jeon Jongseo
- MR: Chŏn Chongsŏ

Jeon Jong-seo (Korean: 전종서), also known as Rachel Jun, is a South Korean actress. She made her acting debut in a leading role in the acclaimed thriller film Burning (2018). She next starred in the film The Call (2020) for which she won the Baeksang Arts Award for Best Actress. She then starred in the English-language film Mona Lisa and the Blood Moon (2021) and in the Netflix series Money Heist: Korea – Joint Economic Area (2022).

== Early life and education ==
Jeon Jong-seo was born in Seoul, the only child in the family. Jeon and her family moved to Canada when she was a child, where she attended a private Christian middle school. After returning to Korea, she graduated from Anyang Arts High School.

After high school, she attended Sejong University, majoring in film. Later, she dropped out of school to pursue her acting career more seriously.

== Career ==
Jeon started her acting career after she joined a management agency and went on her first audition in August 2017, for director Lee Chang-dong's mystery flick Burning. An inexperienced actor without any history in the entertainment industry, Jeon won the competition and landed the lead role at her very first audition to play alongside recognized actors like Yoo Ah-in and Steven Yeun.

Jeon initially did not seek the role of free-spirited Hae-mi in Burning because she thought she had no chance of getting it. The audition took place only three days after she joined her current talent agency. Director Lee Chang-dong said about her audition, "When I saw her, she seemed to have this very childlike sense of innocence, but at the same time, she carried this sense of duality — as if something much bigger was on the other side of that innocence. So I thought she would be great to give Hae-mi the presence that is so central for the film — conveying that inner depth that this character has." And, "Perhaps I was unconsciously drawn to the fact that everything was a 'first time' for her. Also, she has a face that makes people wonder what she's feeling and thinking. I think that made her a good fit for Haemi's character." Lee also said that although the dance scene was in the screenplay, the dance movements were not planned or rehearsed, but rather Jeon's spontaneous movements. Burning premiered at the Cannes Film Festival in May 2018, where Jeon walked the red carpet. The film received universal acclaim, competing for the Palme d'Or at the 2018 Cannes Film Festival, and became the first Korean film to make it to the final nine-film shortlist of Best Foreign Language Film at the 91st Academy Awards.

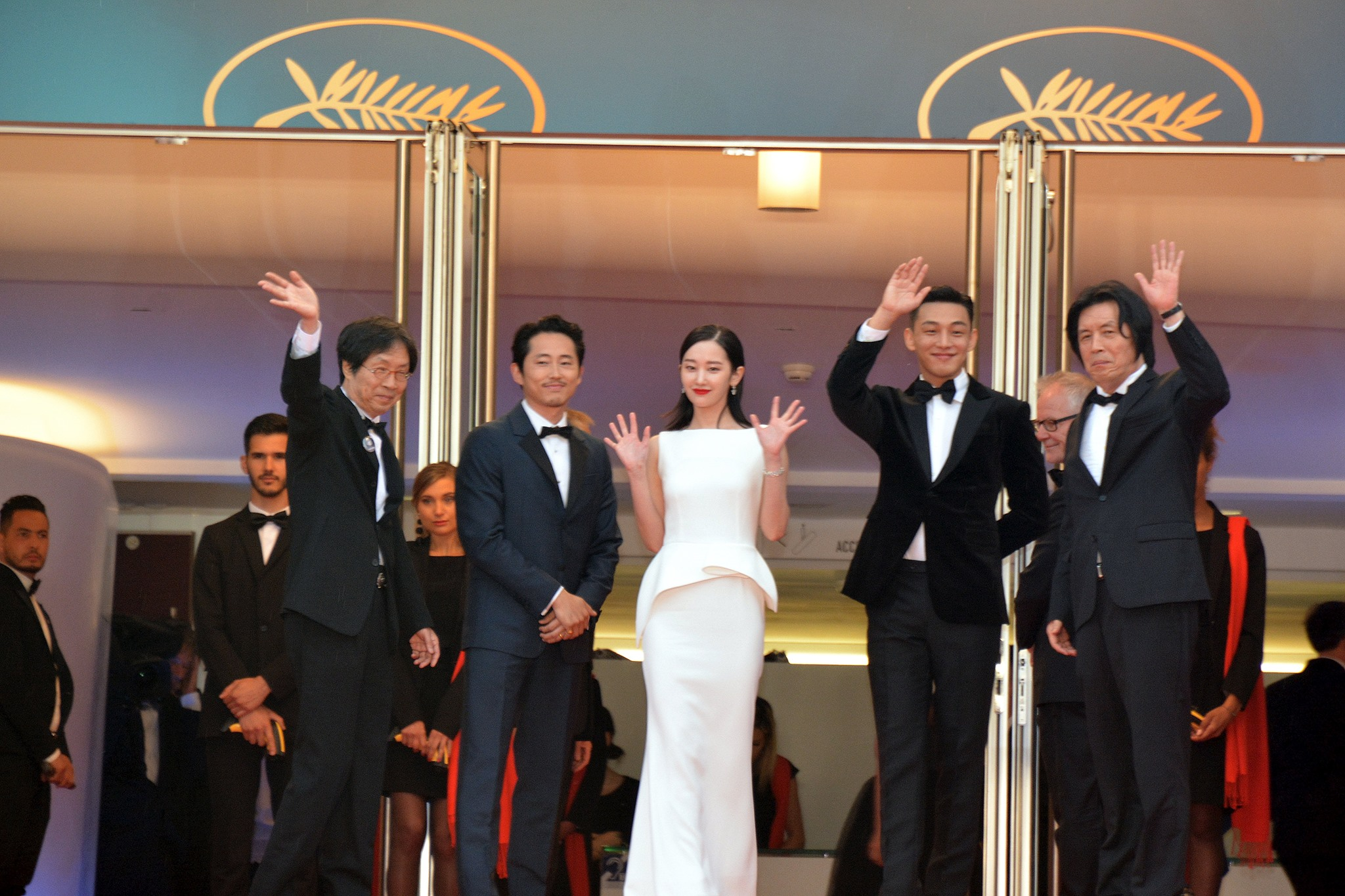
Jeon at 2018 Cannes Film Festival in May 2018

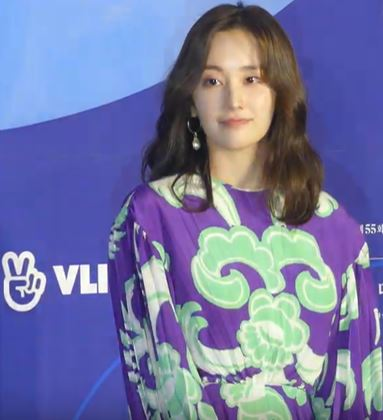
Jeon at 55th Baeksang Arts Awards in May 2019

For her first role in a film, Jeon received international critical acclaim, including Best New Performer winner at the 2019 Asian Film Critics Association Awards, and being selected for The Hollywood Reporter Critics' "15 International Breakout Talents of 2018" feature. Pierce Conran of Screen Anarchy wrote, "Plucked from auditions, first-timer Jeon Jong-seo achieves something almost unthinkable for a rookie, as she embodies a character who is caught between her dreams and reality, her yearning for freedom and role in society, and the powerful desires of those around her and her own. She is magnetic every time she appears on screen, at once playful and aching with a longing for something that she may never understand." John Powers of Vogue wrote, "[i]n a marvelous screen debut, she gives a radiant turn, blooming so brightly—especially in a stoned twilight dance to Miles Davis—that she often outshines her male costars. Whenever she's not on-screen, the film instantly grows darker, unhappier." Justin Chang of Los Angeles Times wrote, "Jeon, making a remarkable screen debut, brings this young woman to beautiful, soulful and defiant life."

In 2020, Jeon starred in her second film, The Call. She played Young-sook, who believes that a telephone connected to the future is the only hope to save herself from making dangerous choices. The film premiered on Netflix in November 2020. Jeon's performance as the antagonist in the film was acclaimed. Anthony Kao of Cinemaescapist called it "an outstanding performance" and wrote, "Jeon's acting gives The Call a constant current of electrifying suspense that lasts even into its post-credit scenes." James Marsh of South China Morning Post wrote, "Jun cements her position as Korean cinema's unhinged ingénue du jour, following her star-making turn in Lee Chang-dong's Burning, with a brilliantly psychotic performance that reveals Young-sook to be just as dangerous as she is fragile and damaged." Decider's Jade Budowski wrote, "Jong-seo Jun is magnificent as Young-sook [...] She's convincing in both her quieter moments and her more maniacal outbursts, masterfully drawing out all the thrills and chills you could hope for with a movie of this nature". For her performance in The Call, Jeon won Best Actress in the 57th Baeksang Arts Awards, and Best Actress awards in the 30th Buil Film Awards and 20th Director's Cut Awards respectively.

The following year, Jeon joined the US-based agency United Talent Agency under her English name Rachel Jun. She made her English-language film debut alongside Kate Hudson and Craig Robinson in Mona Lisa and the Blood Moon, a fantasy-adventure film by Iranian-American writer-director Ana Lily Amirpour, as the lead character Mona. The film had its premiere at the 78th Venice International Film Festival in September 2021. Jeon's performance, as a woman with unusual powers who escapes from a mental asylum and tries to make it on her own in New Orleans, received positive reviews. Lovia Gyarkye from The Hollywood Reporter wrote, "Jeon (Burning) excels in her first English-language role, imbuing Mona with personality despite her limited dialogue". Variety's Owen Gleiberman wrote, "[i]n Jeon Jong-seo's performance as Mona Lisa, you see the power and the alienation. And the two qualities work together in a cool and empathetic way". She next played a late 20s single woman who swears off relationships in a romantic comedy film Nothing Serious alongside Son Suk-ku, directed by Jeong Ga-young of Hit the Night.

Jeon starred in her first series in Money Heist: Korea – Joint Economic Area, the Korean adaptation of the Spanish crime-drama Money Heist, as Tokyo. It was released on Netflix in 2022. She will reunite with The Call director Lee Chung-hyun for his short film Ransom alongside Jin Seon-kyu, and for his Netflix film Ballerina, in which she portrays a former assassin.

On August 22, 2022, Jeon signed an exclusive contract with Andmarq.

On March 17, 2024 Jeon threw the ceremonial first pitch at a preseason exhibition baseball game in which the Los Angeles Dodgers played the Kiwoom Heroes.

== Personal life ==
In December 2021 it was reported that Jeon was in a relationship with The Call director Lee Chung-hyun.

== Filmography ==
=== Film ===
Year	Title	Role	Notes	Ref.
2018	Burning	Shin Hae-mi	Debut film	
2020	The Call	Oh Young-sook		
2021	Mona Lisa and the Blood Moon	Mona Lisa Lee	English-language debut	
2021	Nothing Serious	Ham Ja-young		
2023	Ballerina	Jang Ok-ju		
2025	Project Y	Lee Do-kyung		
TBA	Highlander †	TBA	Filming	
TBA	Dochabi	Ahai	Netflix film	

=== Television ===
Year	Title	Role	Notes	Ref.
2022	Money Heist: Korea – Joint Economic Area	Tokyo		
2022	Bargain	Park Joo-young	Miniseries	
2024	Wedding Impossible	Na Ah-jeong		
2024	Queen Woo	Woo Hee		

== Accolades ==
=== Awards and nominations ===
Name of the award ceremony, year presented, category, nominee of the award, and the result of the nomination
Award ceremony	Year	Category	Nominee / Work	Result	Ref.
APAN Star Awards	2023	Excellence Award, Actress in a Miniseries	Bargain; Money Heist: Korea – Joint Economic Area	Nominated	
Asian Film Awards	2018	Best Newcomer	Burning	Nominated	
Asian Film Awards	2021	Best Actress	The Call	Nominated	
Asian Film Critics Association Awards	2019	Best New Performer	Burning	Won	
Baeksang Arts Awards	2019	Best New Actress – Film	Burning	Nominated	
Baeksang Arts Awards	2021	Best Actress – Film	The Call	Won	
Baeksang Arts Awards	2022	Best Actress – Film	Nothing Serious	Nominated	
Blue Dragon Film Awards	2018	Best New Actress	Burning	Nominated	
Blue Dragon Film Awards	2021	Best Actress	The Call	Nominated	
Chlotrudis Awards	2019	Best Supporting Actress	Burning	Nominated	
Buil Film Awards	2018	Best New Actress	Burning	Nominated	
Buil Film Awards	2021	Best Actress	The Call	Won	
Chunsa Film Art Awards	2019	Best New Actress	Burning	Nominated	
Chunsa Film Art Awards	2021	Best Actress	The Call	Nominated	
Director's Cut Awards	2022	Best Actress in film	The Call	Won	
Director's Cut Awards	2022	Best New Actress in film	The Call	Nominated	
Grand Bell Awards	2018	Best New Actress	Burning	Nominated	
Grand Bell Awards	2023	Best Actress in a series	Bargain	Nominated	
International Cinephile Society	2019	Best Supporting Actress	Burning	Nominated	
International Online Cinema Awards	2019	Best Supporting Actress	Burning	Nominated	
Marie Claire Asia Star Awards	2023	Beyond Cinema Award	Bargain	Won	
The Seoul Awards	2018	Best New Actress	Burning	Nominated	

=== Listicles ===
Name of publisher, year listed, name of listicle, and placement
Publisher	Year	Listicle	Placement	Ref.
Cine21	2020	New Actress to watch out for in 2021	3rd (Note: Tied with Han So-hee)	
Cine21	2020	Actress to watch out for in 2021	3rd	
Cine21	2024	"Korean Film NEXT 50" – Actors	Included	
Korean Film Council	2021	Korean Actors 200 (Note: Introduces 200 actors that best represent the present and future of Korean cinema to the people in the film industry all over the world.)	Included	
