= Far West (Taixi) =

Chinese and Japanese term for Europe

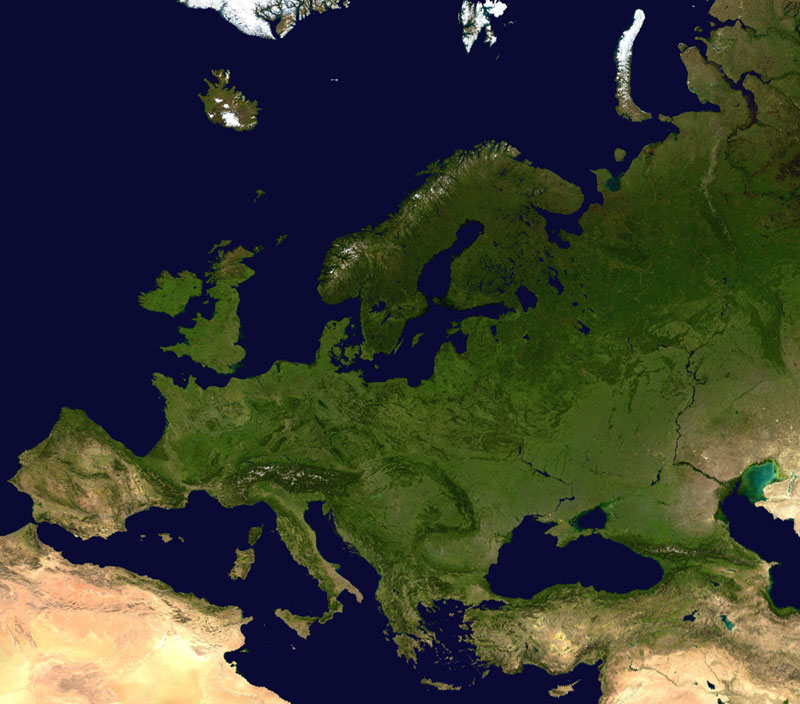
- A satellite image of Europe, historically referred to as the Far West in East Asia

Chinese name
- Traditional Chinese: 泰西
- Simplified Chinese: 泰西
- Literal meaning: Far West
Transcriptions
Standard Mandarin
- Hanyu Pinyin: tàixī

Japanese name
- Kanji: 泰西
- Kana: たいせい
Transcriptions
- Romanization: taisei

The Far West (Chinese: 泰西; pinyin: tàixī) is a Chinese and Japanese term for Europe, or more broadly, for the entire Western world as a cultural region comparable to the East Asian cultural sphere. Originally a name for parts of Inner Asia and India, the term Far West as a Chinese exonym for the West was coined by the Italian Jesuit priest Matteo Ricci. Ricci invented the phrase as an Asian parallel to the Eurocentric notion of the Far East, which positioned Europe as a region on the fringes of a Sinocentric world. The term Far West was also used in Japan and appears in many Japanese publications.

== History ==
=== China ===
It was originally used in China as a name denoting parts of Inner Asia and India. The meaning of the term was changed to encompass Europe during the Chinese Ming dynasty. This semantic change is credited to the Italian Jesuit priest Matteo Ricci, who used the Far West as the Sinocentric counterpart to the Eurocentric concept of the Far East. The Jesuits called India the Little West (小西; xiǎoxī) and identified their homeland as the Far West or the Great West (大西; dàxī). This name is still preserved in the current Chinese name of the Atlantic Ocean, which is called the Ocean of the Great West (大西洋; dàxīyáng), also translated by Ricci during that time.

In his essay An Essay on Friendship in Answer to Prince Jian’an, Matteo Ricci introduces himself by saying, "I, Matteo, from the Far West, have sailed across the seas and entered China with respect for learned virtue of the Son of Heaven of the Great Ming dynasty." He may have used the term to ingratiate himself with his Chinese hosts by identifying Europe as a region on the western fringes of the known Sinocentric world. In 1601, an editor revised the essay by replacing the term Far West with Extreme West (最西; zuìxī; also "westernmost, most west"), possibly because he considered taixi an awkward-sounding name.

European knowledge was designated in China as tàixī xué (泰西學; 'Western learning'). Zhou Bingmo gave Western learning a more elaborate name by calling it taixi zhixue, which first appeared in a postface for the 1628 edition of Matteo Ricci's Jiren shipian (The Ten Paradoxes). The term taixi was still used in the late 19th and early 20th centuries.

The "Western Sea" (西海; xī hǎi) and yuanxi (遠西; 'Far West') were alternative Chinese names for Europe. The Chinese referred to European people as xiren (西人; 'Western people') and European missionaries as xiru (西儒; 'Western scholars').

The term Far West was later expanded to include the United States. The official Zhi Gang wrote a diary titled Chushi Taixi Ji (Record of the First Diplomatic Mission to the Far West) during the 1868 Burlingame Mission, a Chinese diplomatic mission to Europe and America.

=== Japan ===
Europe was also called taisei ("the Far West") in Japan. Rangaku, which literally means "Dutch Learning", was an intellectual tradition that came to prominence in the Sakoku period. The term taisei appears in many sources about Western learning published during that era. Examples include the Taisei gankazensho (Complete book on Western ophthalmology) in 1799, Taisei honzomeiso (Botany of the West) in 1829, and Taisei naika shusei (Compilation on Western internal medicine) in 1832. Western influence also introduced the Japanese to the geographical nomenclature of Europe, which included the idea of Asia as a continent. There were some Japanese intellectuals that opposed adopting the Western notion of Asia, and instead advocated retaining East Asian geographical terminology. One example is Aizawa Seishisai (1781–1863), who claimed that calling Japan an Asian country was an insulting name for the "divine land" (神州, shinshuu). He favored the continued use of traditional terms such as "Far West" or "Southern barbarian" (南蠻, Nanban).
