= Park Hyung-soo =

South Korean actor

- Born: 3 December 1980 (age 45); Seoul, South Korea
- Other name: Park Hyeong-su
- Education: Seoul Institute of the Arts (Department of Theater)
- Occupation: Actor
- Years active: 2008–present
- Agent: TPC Prain
- Known for: The Devil Judge; Crash Landing on You; Happiness
- Spouse: Unknown (m. 2019)

Park Hyung-soo (born December 3, 1980) is a South Korean actor. He is known for his roles in dramas such as Arthdal Chronicles, The Devil Judge, Ballerina, Crash Landing on You and Happiness. He also appeared in movies Confidential Assignment, The Chase, Hit-and-Run Squad, Kingmaker and Confidential Assignment 2: International.

== Personal life ==
Park married his non-celebrity girlfriend in a private ceremony on April 6, 2019 in Seoul.

== Filmography ==
=== Television series ===
Year	Title	Role	Ref.
2017	Prison Playbook	Na Hyung-soo	
2018	After the Rain	Bong-soo	
2019	Arthdal Chronicles	Gil-seon	
2019	Be Melodramatic	President So	
2019	Crash Landing on You	Yoon Sae-hyung	
2020	Hospital Playlist	Lawyer Pyeon	
2020	Amanza	Hyeong-joo	
2021	The Devil Judge	Go In-Gook	
2021	Happiness	Gook Hae-sung	
2022	The Interest of Love	Lee Gu-il	
2024	Flex X Cop	Cheon Tae-jun (episode 3)	
2024	Chicken Nugget	Interviewer	
2024	Nothing Uncovered	No Ji-ho	
2024	No Way Out: The Roulette	Koo Seok-hwan	
2024	Seoul Busters	Special investigation leader	
2025	The Art of Negotiation	Kang Sang-bae	

=== Film ===
Year	Title	Role
2012	Perfect Number	Investigation team member
2013	Way Back Home	Seoul District Prosecutors' Office detective
2014	I Do Need the Certificate of Sanitation Right Now!	Parking lot man
2014	I Do Need to Go to Study Abroad Right Now!	Laundry uncle
2014	Tabloid Truth	Information meeting player
2015	Bargain	Middle aged man
2016	Seoul Searching	Gangster
2017	Confidential Assignment	National Intelligence Service executive
2017	Ordinary Person	Agent
2017	One Line	Secretary Han
2017	The King's Case Note	Officer
2017	The Chase	Bae Doo-shik
2018	Illang: The Wolf Brigade	Barber
2018	The Negotiation	NIS negotiation agent
2018	Swing Kids	Interpreter
2019	Hit-and-Run Squad	Choi Kyung-joon
2019	The Bad Guys: Reign of Chaos	Park Sung-tae
2020	Secret Zoo	Lawyer Song
2020	The Call	Man-voice
2022	Kingmaker	Jeong-hyeon
2022	Confidential Assignment 2: International	NIS agent
2023	The Point Men	Park Jeon-ryak
2023	Dream	Representative Kim
2023	Ballerina	Myung-shik

=== Web series ===
Year	Title	Role	Ref.
2022	Bargain	Hee-sook	
2024	The Tyrant	Chief Cho	

=== Music video appearances ===
Year	Title	Artist	Length	Ref.
2016	The Signal of One Billion Light-Year	Lee Seung-hwan	6:44	

== Stage ==
=== Musical ===
List of Musical Work(s)
Year	Title	Korean Title	Role
2008	Subway 1	지하철 1호선	other than the condition
2009	Wash	빨래	Bread boy
2010	Rock Sitter	락시터	Multi-man

=== Theatre ===
List of Musical Work(s)
Year	Title	Korean Title	Role
2011	Rooftop Cat	옥탑방 고양이	Bundle / Multi Man
2011	Terrifying Scandal	기막힌스캔들	Woo-jin
2012	Comedy Number One	코미디 넘버원	Ginam
