= Far East University (South Korea) =

- Motto: 성실, 창조, 협동 (Sincerity, Creativity, Cooperation)
- Type: Private
- Established: 1998
- President: Lyu Ki-il (류기일)
- Faculty: 74
- Undergraduates: 5,214
- Location: Eumseong County, North Chungcheong, South Korea
- Campus: Rural, 64,000 m^{2}
- Website: www.kdu.ac.kr

- Far East University
- Hangul: 극동대학교
- Hanja: 極東大學校
- RR: Geukdong daehakgyo
- MR: Kŭktong taehakkyo

Far East University (Korean: 극동대학교) is located in Gamgok-myeon, Eumseong County, North Chungcheong province, South Korea. It was founded in 1998 by Taek-hee Lyu. The school flower is the chrysanthemum.

== History ==
Far East University opened on March 5, 1998. Its first graduating class numbered only 164 students but since then, it has grown rapidly, and by 2009 enrollment had topped 5000.

== Organization ==
The undergraduate courses of Far East University are divided among eight colleges and seven independent departments:

- College of Management
- Department of Hotel Tourism
- College of Broadcasting and Multimedia
- College of Social Welfare
- College of Law
- College of Information Communication
- College of Design
- College of Teaching
- Department of Secondary School Special Education
- Department of English
- Department of Japanese
- Department of Chinese
- Department of Theater
- Department of Sports and Leisure
- Department of Electronic Commerce
- Department of Flight Operation

== See also ==
- Education in South Korea
- List of colleges and universities in South Korea
